= Lüder Deecke =

German neurologist

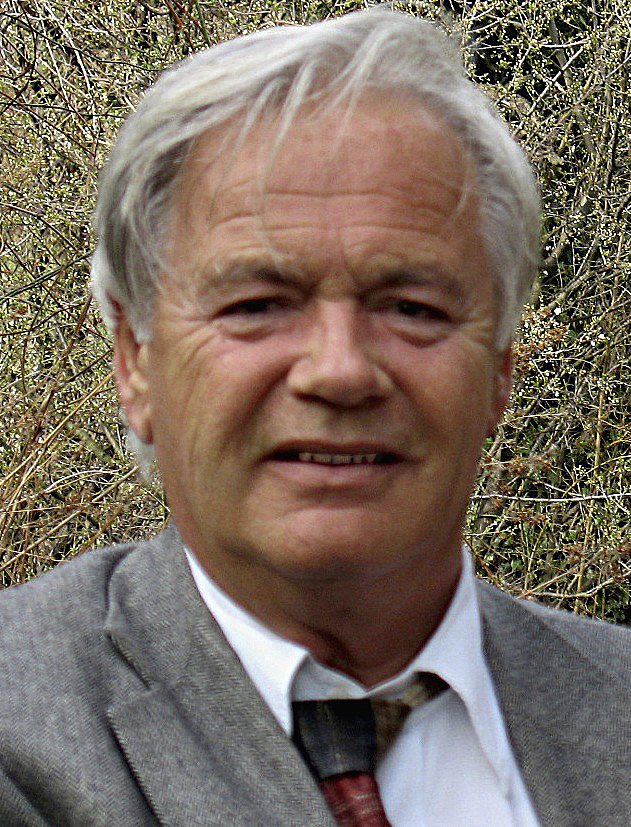
- Born: 22 June 1938 (age 88); Lohe-Rickelshof, Germany
- Citizenship: German–Austrian
- Known for: Bereitschaftspotential and Supplementary motor area
- Awards: Hans-Berger-Award, Prix Théophile Gluge, of the Royal Belgian Academy of Sciences, Brussels
- Scientific career
- Fields: Neurology, Clinical neurology, Neurophysiology, Clinical neurophysiology, Neuroscience, Clinical neuroscience
- Workplaces: University of Vienna, Medical University of Vienna

Lüder Deecke (German: [ˈdeːkə]; born 22 June 1938 in Lohe-Rickelshof, Germany) is a German Austrian neurologist, neuroscientist, teacher and physician whose scientific discoveries have influenced brain research and the treatment and rehabilitation of neurological disorders.

Full professor and head, Department of Clinical Neurology at the University of Vienna Medical University of Vienna, professor emeritus since October 2006, Deecke is also head of the Ludwig Boltzmann Institute for Functional Brain Topography and is the author of a number of books and more than 600 publications in the fields of neurology, clinical neurology, neurophysiology, clinical neurophysiology, neurosciences, brain research, movement disorders, etc.

His early research with Hans Helmut Kornhuber in the mid-1960s led to the discovery of the Bereitschaftspotential (or readiness potential), which is a measure of neural activity in the brain that precedes voluntary movements. This discovery set an important standard in research and rehabilitation of motor systems, and re-introduced the word will in key word registers.

== Scientific contribution ==
In 1964 Deecke performed as doctoral student of Hans Helmut Kornhuber, EEG-recordings in man accompanying volitional movements and actions, and they discovered a slowly increasing activation (negative deflection) in the EEG, which they called Bereitschaftspotential

The term Bereitschaftspotential (BP) can be found in the 'List of German expressions in English'. In order to record brain activity prior to an unforeseeable event – which a voluntary movement undoubtedly is – it needs a special method: the reverse averaging, which was invented by Kornhuber and Deecke in the same year (1964). The full paper appeared in 1965 and was awarded a Citation Classic.

In 1970 and 1971 Deecke was a research fellow in Toronto, Canada, under John M. Fredrickson. He performed experiments in the vestibular system (sense of balance) with rhesus monkeys and found the thalamic relay nucleus, nucleus ventralis posterior inferior (VPI) for the vestibular projection to the cortex. In a second project, he investigated – with the rhesus monkey – normothermic perfusion as a therapeutic means with spinal cord compression, and as a third project the alterations of the auditory evoked potentials under respiratory stress.

In 1978 a further Citation Classic appeared with the discovery that the supplementary motor area (SMA) is active prior to voluntary actions and also prior to the activation of the primary motor cortex (M1, Brodmann-Area4). This publication established the scientific knowledge that the early component of the Bereitschaftspotential (BP1 or BPearly) is generated by the activity of the SMA. BP1 is bilaterally symmetrical, because always – i.e. also with unilateral actions – the SMAs of both hemispheres are active, further substantiated by subsequent research. The second component of the Bereitschaftspotential (BP2 oder BPlate) is generated by the primary motor cortex M1, and BP2 is asymmetrical with unilateral movements, namely dominant over the contralateral hemisphere. In Ulm, Deecke had projects with the DFG (German Research Foundation), and a productive team with research on the vestibular system and the motor system emerged including vestibular and neck interaction. In 1982 during Deecke's visiting professorship on invitation of Hal Weinberg in Vancouver, the Magnetoencephalographic-(MEG-) analogue of the Bereitschaftspotential, the Bereitschaftsmagnetfeld (Bereitschaftsfield, BF) was first recorded.

From 1985 on in Vienna, Deecke has built his own MEG, the first generation with a five-channel MEG-System, and from 1995 on with the MEG Centre Vienna an MEG-whole head system with 143 channels (CTF Vancouver, Canada) has been established. Deecke and his team were successful to prove the participation of the SMA not only with the early Bereitschaftspotential but also with the Bereitschaftsmagnetfeld (Bereitschaftsfield in the MEG, solving the cancellation problem of the two SMAs opposing each other. In 1984 visual tracking movements were investigated. Evidence was found that the frontal cortex (SMA, prefrontal cortex) gives the starting command of the movement or action and supervises it, but the SMA does not execute the action. The frontal brain (including the SMA) is 'delegating' this to the 'expert systems for tracking in the brain', namely to the visual cortex and to the M1.

In 2002 the term Bereitschafts-BOLD response was coined by Ross Cunnington et al. in event-related fMRI studies at the Department of Clinical Neurology and the Department of Radiodiagnostics Medical University of Vienna. Thus, according to Deecke und Kornhuber [7],[15],[16] the early component of the BP (BP1 or BPearly) is generated by the following areas: the SMA proper, the pre-SMA and the cingulate motor area, CMA. This is now called anterior mid-cingulate cortex, aMCC. The second component (BP2 or BP late) is generated by the motor cortex (M1). Contrary to earlier views, the intentional activity according to Kornhuber and Deecke does not travel directly from the SMA to motor cortex M1 but is running via the cortico-basalganglio-thalamo-cortical loop in short motor loop. The motor loop has been discovered in patients with Parkinson's disease (PD). Deep brain stimulation improves frontal cortex function in PD patients. This means that the formation of the will has already taken place in the frontal lobe and the preparation and planning of the action has been transferred initially to the unconscious routine processes of the basal ganglia, which do the groundwork for the motor cortex, M1. M1 finally generates the volley for the pyramidal tract, which then enters consciousness. During the early BP, BP1, the action planning is not yet conscious, but during BP2 it is. From this observation Benjamin Libet, postulated that we do not have free will (BP1) but with the control of the action (BP2) we do have free will. However, Kornhuber and Deecke, have shown that consciousness is not a sine qua non for free will. There are conscious and unconscious agendas in the brain, and both are important. The unconscious agendas far outweigh the conscious agendas, consciousness being only the 'tip of an iceberg'. Therefore, free will is involved with both, the initiation of the action and for the control of the action.

The views of Kornhuber and Deecke upon the SMA and CMA were confirmed in the meantime by Ross Cunnington and his team: The limbic system is always involved in the early planning for action – the matching with the inner needs, the emotional basic state, and our respective mood – has been postulated by Kornhuber and Deecke for quite some time and has been confirmed recently by the Cunnington group. Kornhuber and Deecke have shown that freedom is given, a freedom in degrees of freedom, that humans can regulate up by their own efforts and learning in order to improve their free will, which is not a granted state but a dynamic process.

== Awards and recognitions ==
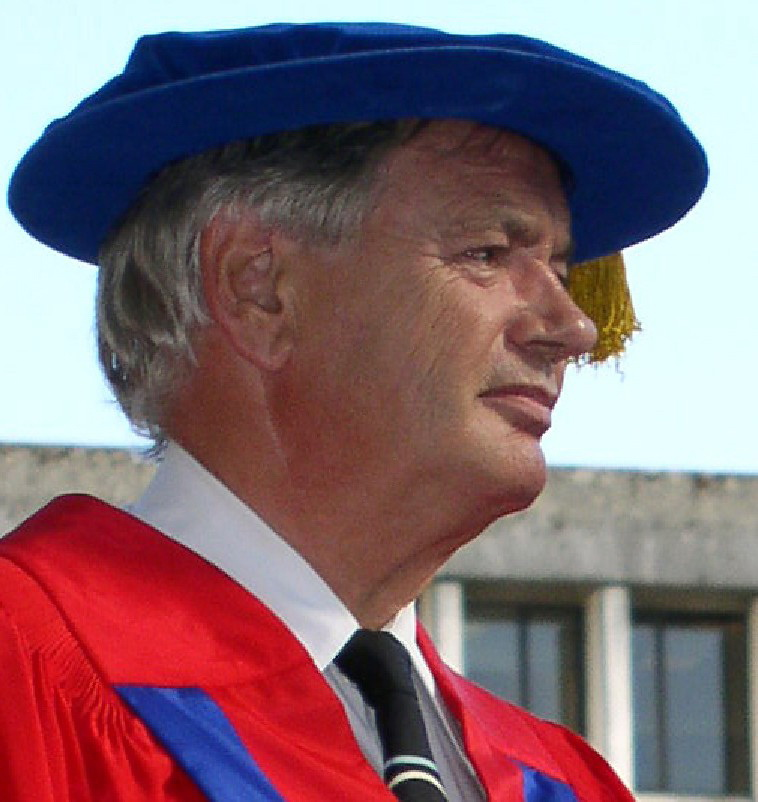
On 2 October 2003 Deecke received the Dr. honoris causa (Dr. h.c.) from Simon Fraser University, Burnaby Greater Vancouver.

- 2015 Fellow der European Academy of Neurology (FEAN)
- 2009 Prix Théophile Gluge, of the Royal Belgian Academy of Sciences, Brussels, Belgium
- 2009 Adjunct Professor, Simon Fraser University, Burnaby, British Columbia, Canada
- 2003 Dr. honoris causa, Simon Fraser University, Burnaby, British Columbia, Canada
- 2000 Hans Berger Award of the German Society for Clinical Neurophysiology
- 1997 Hoechst Award
- 1990 Citation Classic, Current Contents, Institute for Scientific Information (Kornhuber & Deecke, Pflügers Arch. 284: 1–17, 1965 regarding the Bereitschaftspotential
- 1991 Distinguished Visiting Professor, Department of Neurology (Arnold Starr) at the University of California, Irvine, California, United States.
- 1989 Dr. Herbert Reisner Award
- 1982 Distinguished Visiting Professor, Brain Behaviour Laboratory (Hal Weinberg), Simon Fraser University, Vancouver Canada
- 1971 Scientific Award of the City of Ulm

== Publications ==
Books

- with Kornhuber HH (2003) Human freedom, reasoned will, and the brain: The Bereitschaftspotential story. In: M Jahanshahi, M Hallett(Eds) The Bereitschaftspotential, movement-related cortical potentials. Kluwer Academic / Plenum Publishers New York, pp 283–320 ISBN 0-306-47407-7
- Mergner T, Ebner A, Deecke L: Akustisch evozierte Potentiale (AEP) in Klinik und Praxis. Springer, Wien, New York 58 pp. (1989)
- Deecke L, Zeiler K: Wie vermeide ich den Schlaganfall? Beeinflußbare Risikofaktoren. Wien, Facultas Verlag, 89 pp (1990) ISBN 3-85076-271-8
- with K. Zeiler und E. Auff (ed.): Klinische Neurologie. Facultas Universitätsverlag, Wien 2006, ISBN 3-85076-751-5.
- with Jürgen Kriz: Sinnorientiertes Wollen und Handeln zwischen Hirnphysiologie und kultureller Gestaltungsleistung. Picus, Wien 2007, ISBN 978-3-85452-527-1.
- with Hans Helmut Kornhuber: Wille und Gehirn. 2nd. rev. ed. Edition Sirius im Aisthesis-Verlag, Bielefeld/ Basel 2009, ISBN 978-3-89528-628-5.
- Was ist Geist aus der Sicht der Hirnforschung? In: Kurt Appel, H. P. Weber, Rudolf Langthaler, Sigrid Müller (eds.): Naturalisierung des Geistes? Königshausen & Neumann, Würzburg 2008, ISBN 978-3-8260-3811-2.
- Freies Wollen und Handeln aus dem Urgrund der Seele. In: M. F. Peschl (ed.): Die Rolle der Seele in der Kognitions- und Neurowissenschaft. Auf der Suche nach dem Substrat der Seele. Königshausen & Neumann Würzburg 2005, ISBN 3-8260-2909-7, S. 63–108.
- Ist Geist neurophysiologisch fassbar? In: M. F. Peschl, A. Batthyany (eds.): Geist als Ursache? Mentale Verursachung im interdisziplinären Diskurs. Königshausen & Neumann, Würzburg 2008, ISBN 978-3-8260-3806-8, S. 121–161.
- Die Gedanken sind frei – der Wille ist frei. Willensfestigung als psychotherapeutisches Behandlungselement. In: O. Wiesmeyr, A. Batthyany (ed.): Sinn und Person. Beitr. z. Logotherapie und Existenzanalyse von Viktor E. Frankl. (= Beltz-Taschenbuch 179). Beltz Verlag, Weinheim/ Basel 2006, ISBN 3-407-22179-7, S. 331–372.
- with Eccles, John, Mountcastle, Vernon B. (Eds.). From Neuron to Action. An Appraisal of Fundamental and Clinical Research. Springer 1990.

== See also ==
- Free will
- Motor cortex
- Benjamin Libet
