= Self-agency =

Sense that actions are self-generated

Self-agency, also known as the phenomenal will, is the sense that actions are self-generated. Scientist Benjamin Libet was the first to study it, concluding that brain activity predicts the action before one even has conscious awareness of his or her intention to act upon that action (see Neuroscience of free will). However an empirical study in 2019 shows that readiness potentials (agent-independent brain activity) were absent for deliberate decisions, and preceded arbitrary decisions only.

Daniel Wegner defined the three criteria of self-agency: priority, exclusivity, and consistency. According to Wegner, priority means that an action must be planned before the action is initiated. The interval between the action and the effect is known as the intentional binding. Another criterion for self-agency is exclusivity, which means the effect is due to the person's action and not because of other potential causes for the effect. The last criterion Wegner suggested was consistency. Consistency means that one's planned action must occur as planned.

Internal motor cues are also an indicator in deciding whether an action occurred through self-agency, and can be measured by the generation of movement. If the predicted sensory state matches the actual sensory state, then self-agency has likely occurred. No models that predict agency have ever been proven.

== Self-agency as inference under uncertainty ==
Fritz Heider and Marianne Simmel conducted a seminal work on the perception of external causal events. Work on attribution of agency to oneself, however, began with Benjamin Libet's conclusion that brain activity predictive of action precedes conscious awareness of the intention to act, which was later refuted (Neuroscience of free will). Since this demonstration psychologists have been trying to determine the relationship between the sense of agency, also known as the phenomenal will, and actual self-agency.

Daniel Wegner's book The Illusion of Conscious Will (Illusion of control) (Note: See also: Wegner, Daniel M (2003). "The mind's best trick: how we experience conscious will". Trends in Cognitive Sciences. 7 (2). Elsevier BV: 65–69. doi:10.1016/s1364-6613(03)00002-0. ISSN 1364-6613. PMID 12584024. S2CID 3143541.; Wegner, Daniel M. (2004). "Précis of The illusion of conscious will". Behavioral and Brain Sciences. 27 (5). Cambridge University Press (CUP): 649–659. doi:10.1017/s0140525x04000159. ISSN 0140-525X. PMID 15895616. S2CID 29672900.) posits the phenomenal will as the illusory product of post hoc inference. Sense of agency, on this view, is a product of fallible post hoc inference rather than infallible direct access to one's conscious force of will. The attribution of self-agency is made most strongly when the following three conditions are met: priority, exclusivity, and consistency. Thus, one's action must be the exclusive potential cause of the event (exclusivity), one must have had prior thoughts or plans about the action before it occurred (priority), and the action that occurred must match the action that was planned (consistency). An inference of self-agency is thus made under at least three parameters of uncertainty.

On the contrary, neuroscientist Kevin Mitchell believes that self-agency (free will) is real and biologically grounded, not an illusion. He argues that freedom exists in degrees, emerging through evolution as living beings gained more control, self-modeling, and capacity for conscious choice. For Mitchell, agency means the brain’s ability to pause, reflect, and select actions based on goals and values, even within biological and environmental constraints.

== Uncertainty in Wegner’s three conditions: postdictive accounts of agency ==
Most studies of self-attribution of agency can be categorized as examining one or more of Wegner's three conditions of priority, exclusivity, and consistency. By manipulating these three parameters in systematic ways, researchers have shed light on the role that each plays in self-attributions of agency.

=== Priority ===
Wegner suggests that temporal order is critical to attributions of self-agency; the agent must have planned or thought about the event/action before it occurred it in order to feel that he has willed it. This is a natural extension of the commonsense notion that a cause cannot occur after its effect. However, a range of findings have shown that, beyond the basic requirement of cause preceding effect, the specifics of the timing are important. Moreover, judgments of timing (and thus priority) can be influenced by variation of other parameters, chiefly Wegner's consistency condition.

The experience of causing an event alters the subjective experience of their timing. For instance, actions are perceived as temporally shifted towards their effects when they are performed volitionally, but not when involuntarily evoked by transcranial magnetic stimulation. This distortion of the perceived interval between movement and effect is known as intentional binding and is considered an implicit measure of the sense of agency. Moore, Wegner, and Haggard in 2009 show that supraliminal priming affects intentional binding. This effect contains an inferential postdictive component, because the effect shifts the perceived time of action, even when the probability of the effect's occurrence is low.

Gentsch and Schütz-Bosbach in 2011 find top–down modulation of visual event-related potentials by both self agency and priming of self-agency, suggesting that both efferent information and prior thoughts about action consequence inform the sense of agency. Furthermore, Engbert et al. in 2008 showed that intentional binding occurred only when the movement of the response lever was actively generated by the subject; passive movements (initiated by the response lever) did not result in intentional binding. They take these results to suggest that efferent motor commands, rather than just priority and consistency, is key to self-agency attributions.

Intentional binding may not be exclusive to self-agency, however; Strother, House, and Sukhvinder (2010) found intentional binding in a shared action situation where other agents with similar goals and actions were present.

=== Exclusivity ===
Wegner's exclusivity condition posits that attribution of self-agency occurs most strongly in the absence of other potential causes. The presence of other potential causes in temporal and spatial proximity to the event will, all else being equal, result in a diminished sense of self-agency.

Dijksterhuis and colleagues in 2008 found that nonconscious priming with first-person singular pronouns increased feelings of self-agency, while nonconscious priming with other potential causes (computer, God) decreased feelings of self-agency. Hindriks et al. in 2011 have proposed a computational Bayesian inference model of self-attribution of agency that deals mainly with the exclusivity dimension. (Note: For another Bayesian approach to agency and control, see Huys QJ, Dayan P (2009). "A Bayesian formulation of behavioral control". Cognition. 113 (3). Elsevier BV: 314–328. doi:10.1016/j.cognition.2009.01.008. hdl:21.11116/0000-0002-CB81-7. ISSN 0010-0277. PMID 19285311. S2CID 10147779.)

=== Consistency ===
Wegner argues that the event must match the planned action; attribution will be low if the outcome does not match the perceived cause. Wegner and Wheatley in 1999 demonstrated that priming participants with thoughts relevant to a movement just before it was made by another person caused participants to feel they had caused the action themselves. Ebert and Wegner in 2010 also showed that manipulating consistency enhanced both judgments of self-authorship and temporal binding between cause and effect. (Note: See also Haggard, Clark & Kalogeras 2002 and Moore, Wegner & Haggard 2009.)

Other studies have shown that consistency between prior thought and subsequent action can produce a sense of vicarious agency for another person's actions, increase self-agency attributions for one's own actions, and even produce changes in self-attribution when the prior thought is unconscious or the result of nonconscious priming.

== Internal motor cues: predictive accounts of agency ==
Wegner's account is a leading example of a postdictive or inferential account of the attribution of self-agency. On this type of view, the feeling of self-agency emerges entirely from post hoc inference and does not track or emerge from anything directly related to the actual causation of the action.

Computational models of motor control, by contrast, hypothesize that the sense of agency for a given action arises most directly from internal motor representations associated with generating the movement. An internal forward model based on efference copy, for example, can predict the sensory consequences of a motor command and compare them with the actual sensory state after that action has been initiated. If the actual sensory state matches the predicted one, self-agency is (likely to be) inferred. Indeed, the intentional binding effect may depend on the motor efference command; Engbert, Wohlschläger and Haggard in 2008 provide data suggesting that compression of estimated intervals between action and effect occurs only for volitional actions initiated by the self and not for passive actions or for actions performed by others. These authors maintain an efferent motor command is necessary for a sense of agency. Indeed, omitting the effect of an action does eliminate intentional binding, so long as the probability of an effect given an action is sufficiently high.

== Attempts to synthesize predictive and postdictive accounts of agency ==
Synofzik, Vosgerau and Newen in 2008 review findings on comparator models and argue that they cannot account for either a feeling of agency or a judgment of agency. Their multifactorial model separates feeling from judgment and discusses the conceptual level of processing that is added to the latter. Their discussion concerns explicit judgments of agency, however, which may differ from results obtained using implicit measures.

Moore, Lagnado, Deal and Haggard in 2009 investigated whether statistical contingency alone could explain both predictive and inferential postdictive intentional binding effects. Both predictive and postdictive shifts in the time of action perception depended on strong contingency between the action and effect, suggesting that the experience of agency involves causal learning based on statistical contingency.

Although predictive and postdictive accounts of agency are often cast as competitors, they may in fact be reconcilable when attributions of self-agency are viewed within the framework of cognition under uncertainty. In particular, a comparator model based on efference copy can be seen as a more sophisticated way of characterizing Wegner's consistency parameter and the computations that are likely to be a part of it. Basing outcome predictions on motor commands, rather than just higher-level representations of the goal state that an action is intended to bring about, is likely to provide finer-grained predictions with which to compare outcomes, thereby reducing uncertainty in agency attributions. This higher predictive resolution, in turn, could be useful in making exclusivity judgments (Wegner's second condition): even if a particular goal state is brought about, if the way it is brought about does not closely match the motoric prediction, the attribution of agency may be reduced or blocked entirely. Similarly, given evidence that whether or not an action is volitional affects intentional binding, motoric representations and predictions seem also to affect Wegner's priority parameter. As such, predictive and postdictive accounts may simply differ in emphasis and in the level at which they describe the phenomenon, rather than being fundamentally incompatible.

== See also ==
- Free will
- Neuroscience of free will
- Problem of mental causation
- Self-efficacy
- True Will
- Volition (psychology)
