= Ludwig Boltzmann Institute for Functional Brain Topography =

Austrian research institute

- Established: 1993
- Field of research: Neurology, Clinical neurophysiology, Neuroscience, Neuropsychology
- Director: Lüder Deecke (founder)
- Location: Vienna, Austria
- Operating agency: Ludwig Boltzmann Gesellschaft, City of Vienna, Ministry for Science and Research (BMWF)

The Ludwig-Boltzmann-Institute for functional Brain Topography was a research institute for the investigation of the function of brain areas. It was founded in 1993 in Vienna, Austria by Lüder Deecke. With his retirement in 2006 the institute was closed.

== Scientific contribution ==
The institute was composed of several study groups doing research on the following topics:

=== Voluntary motor function ===
After the movement-related potentials had been investigated by Elektroencephalography (EEG) and by Magnetoencephalography (MEG) (Bereitschaftspotential BP or readiness potential), the visiting scientist Ross Cunnington was improving the temporal resolution of the fMRI (Functional magnetic resonance imaging) to an extent that Bereitschaftspotential characteristics in regional cerebral blood flow (rCBF) could be recorded (Event-related fMRI). In a further publication a term was coined for it: Bereitschafts-BOLD-Response. Thus, the Bereitschaftspotential of the EEG has its rCBF equivalent in the fMRI. It is only delayed a few seconds, but has its two components as well, the early and the late BP-BOLD-response. These investigations were carried out by the study group Lang & Deecke.

=== Music processing in the brain ===
In order to investigate the brain activity of music students while composing, the study group Beisteiner selected two methods: Cortical DC-potentials of the EEG and MEG. In the experiment, the students had to solve tasks regarding different elements of composition, employing the dodecaphony of Arnold Schönberg. (1) Theme, basic row (2) Inversion (3) Retrograde (4) Retrograde Inversion. It was shown that such synthetic composing takes place mainly in the right hemisphere (parieto-temporally right). However, the analytical processing led to a predominantly left hemispherical preponderance (left temporal). The investigation of tonal versus atonal sequences of tones was also studied: The first three chords of a cadenza were delivered. By this a harmonious context is introduced, in whose succession a so-called target tone could be either harmonious or disharmonious. The results show a specific P300m (the MEG analog of the EEG's P300) upon the non-harmonious target tones. A P300 occurs, when in a sequence of tones surprisingly other stimuli are intermingled, so called oddballs, here chords that do not fit into the cadenza. This method enables one to directly test whether a music student understands harmony or not, a "marker" to test the ‘feel of harmony’ at conservatories. The study group Beisteiner also provided the pre-operative analysis of patients scheduled for surgery (with fMRI, MEG and DC-EEG).

=== Functional imaging with blind people reading Braille ===
With 14 early blind subjects the study group Uhl was able to show that specific changes occurred in occipital and basal temporo-occipital brain areas only, whereby the primary visual cortex plays an important role. Subcomponents of Braille reading were correlated in different ways: a) Passive tactile stimulation, b) Active tactile pattern recognition and c) mental imagery of Braille. Although Braille reading is tactile, it does not activate the somatosensory cortex, but the primary visual cortex (striate area) or area 17. Thus the visual cortex remains a cortex for the orientation in space as well as for reading in general including reading Braille with fingers when reading with the eyes fails.

=== Smell, emotions and memory. Research on Stutterers ===
The study group Walla showed, that deep (i.e. semantic) encoding of a word is associated with more brain activity than a shallow (letter by letter) encoding. Gender-specifically, in women both hemispheres were equally involved, while men were left-lateralized. Smell and memory are closely related, which was studied for words and faces. With Alzheimer patients, in whom dementia had just started (mild cognitive impairment (MCI)) the MEG proved to be predictive in showing whether a certain MCI patient would develop into an Alzheimer patient. This design was also employed for therapy follow-up studies. In the complex of themes "Smell, emotion, memory, words, faces" an influence of the odorous substance PEA (N-Palmitoyl-ethanolamine) upon the encoding and recognition of faces was found, if these were to be classified into ’appealing’ and ’unappealing.’ Stuttering was investigated as well: 8 stutterers and 8 controls were faced with certain tasks and examined in the MEG. While stuttering in task 1 (silent reading) was not yet noticeable, it was strongly present in task 2 (immediate loud uttering of a word shown): Only the normal controls showed clear neuronal activity prior to the start of speaking. This brain activity is the Readiness Field (RF) or Bereitschaftsfield (BF) and in particular its left-lateralized component BF2 prior to the fluent speech production. With the stutterers' non-fluent speech production, the Bereitschaftsfield was missing or was greatly reduced.

=== Advanced pre-surgical epilepsy diagnostics ===
Research of the study group Baumgartner yielded new insights into temporal lobe epilepsy. By investigating 30 patients of this chronic neurological condition, it was revealed that not only the localisation of the epileptic dipole in the temporal region, but also its orientation in space is important. This led to the classification of two subtypes of patients with medial temporal lobe epilepsy, who have different distribution of the seizures (unilateral or bilateral) and also different prognosis. Also the Rolandic epilepsy was investigated with the MEG for the first time.

== Methods ==
For the localisation of motor, sensory, speech relevant and memory relevant brain areas the following neuroimaging techniques were employed and further developed:

- Elektroencephalography (EEG)
  - High Resolution EEG
  - Current source density, CSD
  - DC-EEG, Direct-Current-EEG
- Magnetoencephalography (MEG)
- Single Photon-Emission-Computed-Tomography (SPECT)
- Functional magnetic resonance imaging (fMRI)

== Publications ==
- Erdler M, Beisteiner R, Mayer D, Kaindl T, Edward V, Windischberger C, Lindinger G, Deecke L: Supplementary motor area activation preceding voluntary movement is detectable with a whole scalp magnetoencephalography system. NeuroImage 11: 697-707 (2000).
- Fuchs A, Mayville JM, Cheyne D, Weinberg H, Deecke L, Kelso JAS: Spatiotemporal analysis of neuromagnetic events underlying the emergence of coordinative instabilities. NeuroImage 12: 71-84 (2000).
- Gartus A, Erdler M, Mayer D, Edward V, Lanzenberger R, Windischberger C, Deecke L, Beisteiner R: Stability of MEG Dipole Solutions depending on Time Point and Filtering. In: K Friston, RSJ Frackowiak, E Bullmore (Eds) Proc 7th Ann Meeting Organization Human Brain Mapping HBM2001. Brighton UK NeuroImage, 13(6): S120 (2001).
- Staresina B, Bauer H, Deecke L, Walla P (2005) Neurocognitive correlates of incidental verbal memory encoding: a magnetoencephalographic (MEG) study. NeuroImage 25(2): 430-443 (2005).
- Staresina B, Bauer H, Deecke L, Walla P (2005) Magnetoencephalographic correlates of different levels in subjective recognition memory. NeuroImage 27(1): 83-94 (2005).

== See also ==
- Psychoacoustics
- Bereitschaftspotential
