= Mark Hallett (neurologist) =

American neurologist (1943–2025)

- Born: 1943; Philadelphia, Pennsylvania, U.S.
- Died: November 2, 2025 (aged 82)
- Education: Harvard
- Known for: Physiology of motor control and movement disorders
- Spouse: Judith Peller (m. 1966)
- Children: 2
- Scientific career
- Workplaces: NIH Intramural Research Program
- Doctoral advisor: C. David Marsden
- Notable students: Alvaro Pascual-Leone Brian Berman, MD

Mark Hallett (1943 – November 2, 2025) was an American neurologist who researched the physiology of human movement and movement disorders including functional motor disorders at the NIH and served as Distinguished NIH Investigator Emeritus. Hallett worked at NIH for 40 years in the federal government, with several decades at the Human Motor Control Section and was previously chief of the Clinical Neurophysiology Laboratory at Brigham and Women's Hospital.

== Research ==
Hallett contributed work "to the principles of normal human voluntary movement, understanding the motor system and movement disorders including dystonia, parkinsonism and myoclonus, and the use of transcranial magnetic stimulation (TMS) and botulinum toxin to treat movement disorders." He was noted for his prolific research output throughout his career and ranked as the 96th most cited scientist in the United States, according to Research.com, by h-index. Hallett suggested that education, awareness, and availability of the latest treatment programs remained a key challenge for motor diseases. His work was considered pioneering in the field of functional motor disorders.

He was also considered a pioneer of the field of TMS and helped create the first conferences on TMS safety guidelines, as well as providing additional foundational research around principles of brain stimulation; he was awarded the 2019 International Brain Stimulation Award as a result.

== Career ==
Hallett graduated from Harvard with an AB and MD and trained at Peter Bent Brigham hospital and Massachusetts General Hospital. Hallett also founded the Functional Neurological Disorder Society in 2003 and served as an editor in chief of Clinical Neurophysiology. He also served as President of the International Parkinson and Movement Disorder Society and Vice-President of the American Academy of Neurology. He retired from NIH and later held the title of professor emeritus after 40 years of federal service. Hallett pioneered experimental botulinum injections to treat Leon Fleisher's hand dystonia. In the wake of diplomats suffering Havana Syndrome, Hallett was among the physicians asked to examine the diplomats.

== Neurophysiology of free will ==
Hallett worked on topics of volition and free will through a neurophysiological lens, including reformulations of the Libet clock experiment, and an auditory paradigm to refine the measurement of the conscious intention to move. Furthermore, he investigated the potential causal role of conscious awareness in voluntary action, using a backward masking experiment.

== Personal life and death ==
Hallett was born in Philadelphia, Pennsylvania, in 1943 to Estelle (née Barg) and ophthalmologist Joseph W. Hallett. He married Judith Peller in 1966 shortly after her graduation from Wellesley College, and they had two children, Nicholas and Victoria. Hallett died from glioblastoma at home on November 2, 2025, at the age of 82.
