= Bereitschaftspotential =

Neurological measurement

In neurology, the Bereitschaftspotential or BP (German for "readiness potential"), also called the pre-motor potential or readiness potential (RP), is a measure of activity in the motor cortex and supplementary motor area of the brain leading up to voluntary muscle movement. The BP is a manifestation of cortical contribution to the pre-motor planning of volitional movement. It was first recorded and reported in 1964 by Hans Helmut Kornhuber and Lüder Deecke at the University of Freiburg in Germany. In 1965 the full publication appeared after many control experiments.

== Discovery ==
In the spring of 1964 Hans Helmut Kornhuber (then docent and chief physician at the department of neurology, head Professor Richard Jung, university hospital Freiburg im Breisgau) and Lüder Deecke (his doctoral student) went for lunch to the 'Gasthaus zum Schwanen' at the foot of the Schlossberg hill in Freiburg. Sitting alone in the beautiful garden they discussed their frustration with the passive brain research prevailing worldwide and their desire to investigate self-initiated action of the brain and the will. Consequently, they decided to look for cerebral potentials in man related to volitional acts and to take voluntary movement as their research paradigm.

The possibility to do research on electrical brain potentials preceding voluntary movements came with the advent of the 'computer of average transients' (CAT computer), invented by Manfred Clynes, the first still simple instrument available at that time in the Freiburg laboratory. In the electroencephalogram (EEG) little is to be seen preceding actions, except of an inconstant diminution of the α- (or μ-) rhythm. The young researchers stored the electroencephalogram and electromyogram of self-initiated movements (fast finger flexions) on tape and analyzed the cerebral potentials preceding movements time-reversed with the start of the movement as the trigger, literally turning the tape over for analysis since they had no reversal playback or programmable computer. A potential preceding human voluntary movement was discovered and published in the same year. After detailed investigation and control experiments such as passive finger movements the Citation Classic with the term Bereitschaftspotential was published.

== Mechanism ==
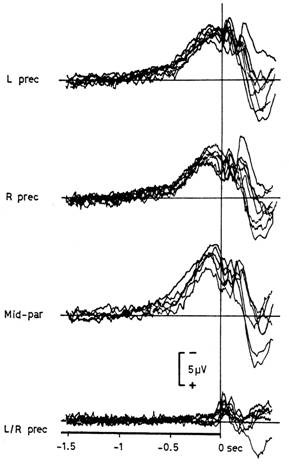
Typical recording of a Bereitschaftspotential

The BP is ten to hundred times smaller than the α-rhythm of the EEG; only by averaging, relating the electrical potentials to the onset of the movement it becomes apparent. Figure shows the typical slow shifts of the cortical DC potential, called Bereitschaftspotential, preceding volitional, rapid flexions of the right index finger. The vertical line indicates the instant of triggering t = 0 (first activity in the EMG of the agonist muscle). Recording positions are left precentral (L prec, C3), right precentral (R prec, C4), mid-parietal (Pz); these are unipolar recordings with linked ears as reference. The difference between the BP in C3 and in C4 is displayed in the lowest graph (L/R prec). Superimposed are the results of eight experiments as obtained in the same subject (B.L.) on different days. see Deecke, L.; Grözinger, B.; Kornhuber H.H. (1976)

Note that the BP has two components, the early one (BP1) lasting from about −1.2 to −0.5; the late component (BP2) from −0.5 to shortly before 0 sec. The pre-motion positivity is even smaller, and the motor-potential which starts about fifty to sixty milliseconds before the onset of movement and has its maximum over the contralateral precentral hand area is still smaller. Thus, it takes great care to see these potentials: exact triggering by the real onset of movement is important, which is especially difficult preceding speech movements. Furthermore, artifacts due to head-, eye-, lid-, mouth-movements and respiration have to be eliminated before averaging because such artifacts may be of a magnitude which makes it difficult to render them negligible even after hundreds of sweeps. In the case of eye movements eye muscle potentials have to be distinguished from cerebral potentials. In some cases animal experiments were necessary to clarify the origin of potentials such as the R-wave. Therefore, it took many years until some of the other laboratories were able to confirm the details of Kornhuber & Deecke's results. In addition to the finger or eye movements as mentioned above, the BP has been recorded accompanying willful movements of the wrist, arm, shoulder, hip, knee, foot and toes. It was also recorded prior to speaking, writing and also swallowing. Amplitude and distribution of the BP are modulated by the force and velocity of the intended movement, and by the information processed in preparation of the movement such as any change from one to another limb. The BP can therefore be used as a tool to analyse such preparatory processes.

The magnetoencephalographic (MEG) equivalent of the Bereitschaftspotential (BP), 'Bereitschafts(magnetic)field' (BF), or readiness field (RF) was first recorded in Hal Weinberg's laboratory at Simon Fraser University Burnaby B.C. Canada in 1982. It was confirmed that the early component, BP 1 or BF1, respectively was generated by the supplementary motor area (SMA), including the pre-SMA, while the late component, BP2 or BF2, was generated by the primary motor area, MI.

A very similar event-related potential (ERP) component had earlier been discovered by the British neurophysiologist William Grey Walter in 1962 and published in 1964. It is the contingent negative variation (CNV). The CNV also comprises two waves; the initial wave (i.e., O wave) and the terminal wave (i.e., E wave). The terminal CNV has similar characteristics as the BP and many researchers have claimed that the BP and the terminal CNV are the same component. At least there is a consensus that both indicate a preparation of the brain for a following behavior.

== Outcomes ==
The Bereitschaftspotential was received with great interest by the scientific community, as reflected by Sir John Eccles's comment: "There is a delightful parallel between these impressively simple experiments and the experiments of Galileo Galilei who investigated the laws of motion of the universe with metal balls on an inclined plane". The interest was even greater in psychology and philosophy because volition is traditionally associated with human freedom (cf. Kornhuber 1984). The spirit of the time, however, was hostile to freedom in those years; it was believed that freedom is an illusion. The tradition of behaviourism and Freudism was deterministic. While will and volition were frequently leading concepts in psychological research papers before and after the first world war and even during the second war, after the end of the second world war this declined, and by the mid-sixties these key words completely disappeared and were abolished in the thesaurus of the American Psychological Association. The BP is an electrical sign of participation of the supplementary motor area (SMA) prior to volitional movement, which starts activity prior to the primary motor area. The BP has precipitated a worldwide discussion about free will (cf. the closing chapter in the book "The Bereitschaftspotential").

As said above, the activity of the SMA generates the early component of the Bereitschaftspotential (BP1 or BP early). The SMA has the starting function of the movement or action. The role of the SMA was further substantiated by Cunnington et al. 2003, showing that SMA proper and pre-SMA are active prior to volitional movement or action, as well as the cingulate motor area (CMA). This is now called ‘anterior mid-cingulate cortex (aMCC)’. Recently it has been shown by integrating simultaneously acquired EEG and fMRI that SMA and aMCC have strong reciprocal connections that act to sustain each other’s activity, and that this interaction is mediated during movement preparation according to the Bereitschaftspotential amplitude.

EEGs and EMGs are used in combination with Bayesian inference to construct Bayesian networks which attempt to predict general patterns of Motor Intent Neuron Action Potentials firing. Researchers attempting to develop non-intrusive brain–computer interfaces are interested in this, as are system analysis, operations research, and epistemology (e.g. the Smith predictor has been suggested in the discussion).

=== BP and free will ===
In a series of neuroscience of free will experiments in the 1980s, Benjamin Libet studied the relationship between conscious experience of volition and the BP e.g. and found that the BP started about 0.35 sec earlier than the subject's reported conscious awareness that "now he or she feels the desire to make a movement." Libet concludes that we have no free will in the initiation of our movements; though, since subjects were able to prevent intended movement at the last moment, we do have the ability to veto these actions ("free won't").

These studies have provoked widespread debate.

In 2016, a group around John-Dylan Haynes in Berlin (Germany) determined the time window after the BP in which an intended motion could possibly be cancelled upon command. The authors tested whether human volunteers could win a "duel" against a BCI (brain–computer interface) designed to predict their movements in real-time from observations of their EEG activity (the BP). They aimed to determine the exact time at which cancellation (veto) of movements was not possible anymore (the point of no return). The computer was trained to predict by means of the BP when a proband would move. The point of no return was at 200 ms before the movement. However, even after that, when a pedal was already set in motion, the subjects were able to reschedule their action by not completing the already started behavior. The authors pointed out in their report that cancellation of self-initiated movements had already been reported by Libet in 1985. Thus, the new achievement was a more precise determination of the point of no return.

In an empirical study in 2019, researchers found that readiness potentials were absent for deliberate decisions, and preceded arbitrary decisions only.

== Applications ==
An interesting use of the Bereitschaftspotential is in brain–computer interface (BCI) applications; this signal feature can be identified from scalp recording (even from single-trial measurements) and interpreted for various uses, for example control of computer displays or control of peripheral motor units in spinal cord injuries. The most important BCI application is the 'mental' steering of artificial limbs in amputees.

== See also ==
- C1 and P1
- Contingent negative variation
- Difference due to memory
- Early left anterior negativity
- Epiphenomenalism
- Error-related negativity
- Late positive component
- Lateralized readiness potential
- Mismatch negativity
- N2pc
- N100
- N170
- N200
- N400
- P3a
- P3b
- P200
- P300 (neuroscience)
- P600
- Somatosensory evoked potential
- Visual N1
