= Ludwig Boltzmann Gesellschaft =

Austrian network of specialized research institutions

The Ludwig Boltzmann Gesellschaft (LBG) is an Austrian network of specialized research institutes that are not part of a university. It was founded in 1961 and named after physicist Ludwig Boltzmann. In 1999, the Ludwig Boltzmann Gesellschaft comprised 131 institutes in the fields of medicine, humanities and social sciences. After 2006, the number of institutes was greatly reduced.

== Current institutes ==
- LBI Applied Diagnostics
- LBI Archaeological Prospection and Virtual Reality
- LBI Cancer Research
- LBI Clinical Forensic Imaging
- LBI COPD and Respiratory Epidemiology
- LBI Electrical Stimulation and Physical Rehabilitation
- LBI Experimental and Clinical Traumatology
- LBI für Health Technology Assessment
- LBI History and Theory of Biography
- LBI Human Rights
- LBI Lung Vascular Research
- LBI Neo-Latin Studies
- LBI Osteology
- LBI Rare and Undiagnosed Diseases

== Current clusters ==
- LBC Arthritis and Rehabilitation
- LBC Cardiovascular Research
- LBC History
- LBC Oncology

== See also ==
- Ludwig Boltzmann Institute for Functional Brain Topography
- Ludwig Boltzmann Institute for Neo-Latin Studies
- Ludwig Boltzmann Institut für Menschenrechte
