= Ralph W. Gerard =

American neuroscientist (1900–1974)

Ralph Waldo Gerard
- Born: 7 October 1900; Harvey, Illinois, U.S.
- Died: 17 February 1974 (aged 73); Newport Beach, California, U.S.
- Education: University of Chicago
- Known for: Nerve metabolism, psychopharmacology, and biological bases of schizophrenia
- Scientific career
- Fields: Neurophysiology, behavioral science, general systems theory
- Doctoral students: Benjamin Libet

Ralph Waldo Gerard (7 October 1900 – 17 February 1974) was an American neurophysiologist and behavioral scientist known for his wide-ranging research on the nervous system, nerve metabolism, psychopharmacology, and the biological basis of schizophrenia.

== Biography ==
Gerard was born in Harvey, Illinois. He was a grandson of Rabbi Yaakov Gesundheit and a cousin of investor Benjamin Graham. Gerard was an unusually gifted intellectual and was encouraged in science by his father, Maurice Gerard, who received an engineering degree in England and then moved to America to work as an engineering consultant. Maurice encouraged Ralph in mathematics and chess. In his teens, Ralph defeated the American chess champion in simultaneous matches in Chicago. He completed high school in two years and entered the University of Chicago at age fifteen. Gerard was a member of the Pi Lambda Phi fraternity.

At the University of Chicago, Gerard studied chemistry and physiology. In chemistry, he was influenced by Julius Stieglitz, and in physiology and neurophysiology by Anton Carlson and Ralph Lillie. He received his B.S. degree in 1919 and a doctorate in physiology in 1921. Shortly thereafter, he married the psychiatrist Margaret Wilson, who had just completed her doctorate in neuroanatomy. She became an outstanding practitioner of child psychiatry until her death in 1954. Gerard began his career as a professor of physiology at the University of South Dakota but returned to the Rush Medical College to complete his medical training, receiving his M.D. degree in 1925. Afterwards, he went to Europe on a National Research Council Fellowship for two years to work in biophysics and biochemistry with A. V. Hill in London and Otto Meyerhof in Kiel.

He returned to the University of Chicago in 1928, where he worked in the Department of Physiology until 1952. For two years, he served as professor of neurophysiology and physiology in the College of Medicine at the University of Illinois. During the Second World War, he was seconded to conduct classified research at the Edgewood Arsenal.

In 1954, Gerard was a Fellow at the Center for Advanced Study in the Behavioral Sciences in Stanford, California. In January 1955, he married Leona Bachrach Chalkley, whom he had known since high school. They moved to the University of Michigan in Ann Arbor, where he helped to establish the Mental Health Research Institute, which in subsequent years became one of the nation’s leading centers for behavioral and psychiatric research.

In the final phase of his career, Gerard concentrated on education. He helped organize the newly forming Irvine campus of the University of California and became the first Dean of its Graduate Division until his retirement in 1970. Even then, Gerard remained active in neurosciences; he initiated, under the auspices of the United States National Academy of Sciences, the activities that led to the founding of the Society for Neuroscience, of which he was made Honorary President. At age seventy, he retired and dedicated his time to civil affairs.

Gerard received many honors, including a medal from Charles University in Prague, the Order of the White Lion (4th class) of Czechoslovakia, honorary membership in the American Psychiatric Association and the Pan Hellenic Medical Association, membership in the American Academy of Arts and Sciences and the National Academy of Sciences, a D.Sc. from the University of Maryland in 1952, and an honorary M.D. from the University of Leiden in 1962, awarded during the XXII International Congress of Physiological Sciences.

The Ralph W. Gerard Prize in Neuroscience honors an outstanding scientist who has made significant contributions to neuroscience throughout his or her career.

== Bibliography ==
Gerard authored approximately 500 scientific papers and nine books, investigating the biology of language, ethics, biology and cultural evolution, education, and the impact of science on public policy. His nine books include:

- Unresting Cells (1940)
- Body Functions (1941)
- Methods in Medical Research (1950)
- Food for Life (1952)
- Mirror to Physiology (1958)
- Psychopharmacology: The Problem of Evaluation (with Cole) (1959)

He also authored numerous research and review articles, including:

- R.W. Gerard, D. Hill & Y. Zotterman, The effect of frequency of stimulation on the heat production of the nerve, in: J. Physiol. 63, pp. 130–143 (1927)
- R.W. Gerard & Otto Meyerhof, Studies on nerve metabolism. III. Chemismus and intermediarprozess, in: Biochem. Z. 191, pp. 125–146 (1927)
- E.G. Holmes & R.W. Gerard, Studies on nerve metabolism: Carbohydrate metabolism of resting mammalian nerve, in: Biochem. J. 23, pp. 738–747 (1929)
- G. Ling & R.W. Gerard, The normal membrane potential of frog sartorius fibers, in: J. Cell. Comp. Physiol. 34, pp. 383–396 (1949)
- L.G. Abood, R.W. Gerard, J. Banks & R.D. Tschirgi, Substrate and enzyme distribution in cells and cell fractions of the nervous system, in: Am. J. Physiol. 168, pp. 728–738 (1952)
- L.G. Abood, R.W. Gerard & S. Ochs, Electrical stimulation of metabolism of homogenates and particulates, in: Am. J. Physiol. 171, pp. 134–139 (1952)
- R.W. Gerard, By-ways of the investigator: thoughts on becoming an elder statesman. Past president's address, in: Am. J. Physiol. 171, pp. 695–703 (1952)
- R.W. Gerard, Prefatory chapter: The organization of science, in: Annu. Rev. Physiol. 14, pp. 1–12 (1952)
- R.W. Gerard, Central excitation and inhibition, in: H. von Foerster & M. Mead (eds.), Cybernetics, pp. 127–150, New York: Josiah Macy Jr. Foundation (1953)
- H.P. Jenerick & R.W. Gerard, Membrane potential and threshold of single muscle fibers, in: J. Cell. Comp. Physiol. 42, pp. 79–102 (1953)
- R.W. Gerard, C. Kluckhohn & A. Rapoport, Biological and cultural evolution: Some analogies and explorations, in: Behavioral Science 1, pp. 6–34 (1953)
- R.W. Gerard, International physiology, in: Physiologist 6, pp. 332–334 (1963)
