= Markus F. Peschl =

Austrian philosopher (born 1965)

Markus F. Peschl (born 1965) is an Austrian cognitive scientist, philosopher of mind, philosopher of science and researcher on innovation, and professor for Cognitive Science and Philosophy of Science at the University of Vienna, Austria. He is known for his early work on cognitive modelling, and his more recent work concerning a"socio-epistemological approach to innovation."

== Life and work ==
Peschl obtained his MA in Computer Science (studies in Cognitive Science & Psychology) at the Vienna University of Technology in 1983, and in 1989 his PhD in computer science and cognitive science at the Vienna University of Technology.

Peschl started his academic career at the University of California, San Diego (UCSD, cognitive science, neuroscience, and philosophy department), at the University of Sussex and in France for post-doctoral research. Peschl is professor for Cognitive Science and Philosophy of Science at the University of Vienna, Austria.

His focus of research is on the highly interdisciplinary question of knowledge (creation/innovation, construction) in various contexts: in natural and artificial cognitive systems, in science, in organizations, in educational settings, and in the context of knowledge technologies and their embedding in social systems. He is working in the field of radical innovation, where he developed the concepts of "emergent innovation" and "enabling spaces."

== Selected publications ==
- Peschl, Markus F. Cognitive modelling. Ein Beitrag zur cognitive science aus der Perspektive des Konstruktivismus und des Konnektionismus, Wiesbaden Dt. Universitätsverlag, 1990.
- Peschl, Markus F. Formen des Konstruktivismus in Diskussion. Materialien zu den "acht Vorlesungen über den konstruktiven Realismus", Wien 1991, WUV-Verlag.
- Peschl, Markus F. Repräsentation und Konstruktion. Kognitions- und neuroinformatische Konzepte als Grundlage einer naturalisierten Epistemologie und Wissenschaftstheorie, Braunschweig/Wiesbaden 1994.
- Peschl, Markus F., and Alexander Riegler. Does representation need reality?. Springer US, 1999.
- Peschl, Markus F (2007). "Triple-loop learning as foundation for profound change, individual cultivation, and radical innovation. Construction processes beyond scientific and rational knowledge". Constructivist Foundations. 2 (2–3): 136–145.
- Peschl, Markus F., and Thomas Fundneider. "Emergent Innovation and Sustainable Knowledge Co-creation A Socio-epistemological Approach to "Innovation from within"." The Open Knowledge Society. A Computer Science and Information Systems Manifesto. Springer Berlin Heidelberg, 2008. 101-108.
- Peschl, M. F.; Fundneider, T. (2012). "Spaces enabling game-changing and sustaining innovations: Why space matters for knowledge creation and innovation" (PDF). Journal of Organisational Transformation and Social Change. 9 (1): 41–61. doi:10.1386/otsc.9.1.41_1.
- Peschl, M.F.; Fundneider, T. (2014). "Designing and enabling interfaces for collaborative knowledge creation and innovation. From managing to enabling innovation as socio-epistemological technology". Computers in Human Behavior. 37: 346–359. doi:10.1016/j.chb.2012.05.027.
- Tebbich, S.; Griffin, S.G.; Peschl, M.F.; Sterelny, K. (2016). "From mechanisms to function. An integrated framework of animal innovation". Philosophical Transactions of the Royal Society B. 371 (1690): 1–11. doi:10.1098/rstb.2015.0195. PMC 4780537. PMID 26926285.
- Peschl, M.F.; Fundneider, T. (2016). Design as anticipation and innovation. Brighton, UK: Design Research Society, Proceedings of DRS 2016, Design Research Society 50th Anniversary Conference. pp. 1–14.
- Grisold, T.; Peschl, M.F. (2017). "Why a systems thinking perspective on cognition matters for innovation and knowledge creation. A framework towards leaving behind our projections from the past for creating new futures". Systems Research and Behavioral Science. 34 (3): 335–353. doi:10.1002/sres.2456.
- Grisold, T.; Peschl, M.F. (2016). Change from the inside out. Towards a culture of unlearning by overcoming Organizational Predictive Mind. Münster, New York: In N. Tomaschek and D. Unterdorfer (Eds.), Veränderung. Der Wandel als Konstante unserer Zeit. pp. 45–63.
- Peschl, M.F.; Fundneider, T. (2017). Uncertainty and opportunity as drivers for re-thinking management: Future-oriented organizations by going beyond a mechanistic culture in organizations. In W. Küpers, S. Sonnenburg, and M. Zierold (Eds.), ReThinking Management: Perspectives and impacts of cultural turns and beyond. Wiesbaden: Springer. pp. 79–96.
- Peschl, M.F.; Fundneider, T. (2017). Future-oriented innovation. How affordances and potentials can teach us how to learn from the future as it emerges. In W. Hofkirchner and M. Burgin (Eds.), The future information society. Social and technological problems. Singapore: World Scientific Publishing. pp. 223–240.
- Peschl, M.F. (2018). Shifting from collaboration with others to collaboration with the future in design and innovation processes. In DMI Design Management Institute (Ed.), Next wave. The21st dmi: Academic Design Management Conference Proceedings. Design Management Institute. Boston, Mass: DMI. pp. 279–288.
- Hartner-Tiefenthaler, M.; Rötzer, K.; Bottaro, G.; Peschl, M.F. (2018). "When relational and epistemological uncertainty act as driving forces in collaborative knowledge creation processes among university students". Thinking Skills and Creativity. 28 (June 2018): 21–40. doi:10.1016/j.tsc.2018.02.013.
