= John-Dylan Haynes =

British-German brain researcher (born 1971)

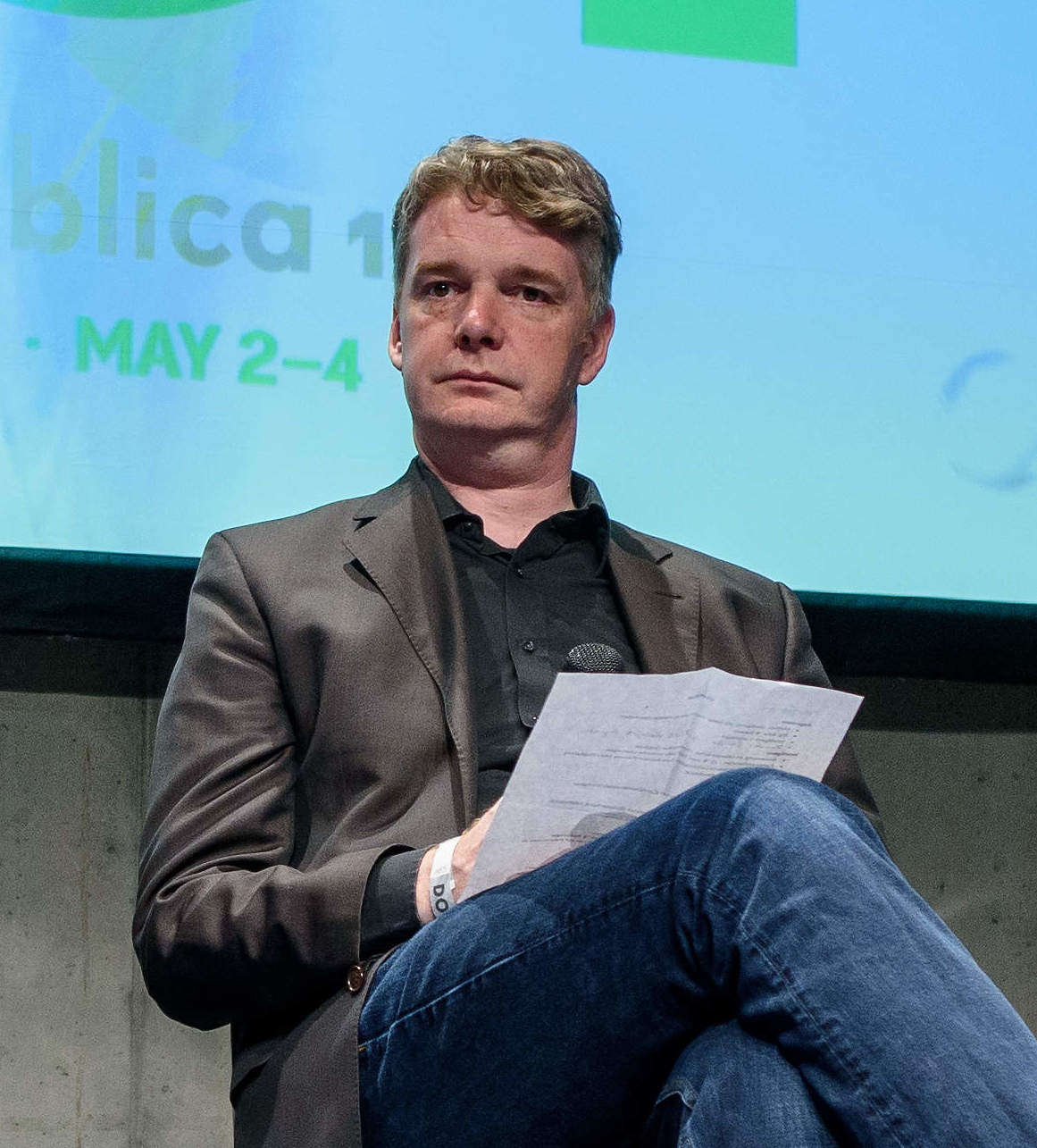
- John-Dylan Haynes (2018)
- Born: 1971 (age 54–55); Folkestone, Great Britain
- Education: University of Bremen
- Scientific career
- Fields: Neuroscience
- Workplaces: Charité; Humboldt University of Berlin
- Thesis: Neural Correlates of Conscious Perception (2002)
- Doctoral advisor: Gerhard Roth

John-Dylan Haynes (born 1971) is a British-German brain researcher.

Haynes studied psychology and philosophy at the University of Bremen from 1992 to 1997. In 2003 he received his doctorate from the Institute of Biology in Bremen. After research stays in Magdeburg, Plymouth (Plymouth Institute of Neuroscience, 2002-2003) and London (Institute of Cognitive Neuroscience and Wellcome Department of Imaging Neuroscience, University College London, 2002-2005) he became head of a research group at the Max Planck Institute for Cognitive and Neurosciences in Leipzig in 2005.

Since 2006 he has been professor of theory and analysis of long-range brain signals at the Bernstein Center for Computational Neuroscience and at the Berlin Center for Advanced Neuroimaging (BCAN) of the Charité and the Humboldt University of Berlin. In 2007 his research group was able to predict volitional decisions up to 12 seconds before they became conscious, thus improving the time bound of 0.5 seconds found in the 1980s by Benjamin Libet. In 2008 he was a member-at-large of the Association for the Scientific Study of Consciousness's executive committee. In 2016, he got a Brain-Computer Interface Award for the work Brain-Computer Interfaces based on fMRI for Volitional Control of Amygdala and Fusiform Face Area: Applications in Autism with the TU Berlin's Neurotechnology Group.

== Publications ==
- Haynes, J.D.; G. Roth; M. Stadler; H.J. Heinze (2003). "Neuromagnetic Correlates of Perceived Contrast in Primary Visual Cortex". Journal of Neurophysiology. 89 (5): 2655–2666. doi:10.1152/jn.00820.2002. PMID 12612045. S2CID 1284514.
- J. D. Haynes; G. Rees (2005). "Predicting the orientation of invisible stimuli from activity in human primary visual cortex". Nature Neuroscience. 8 (5): 686–691. doi:10.1038/nn1445.
- John-Dylan Haynes; Katsuyuki Sakai; Geraint Rees; Sam Gilbert; Chris Frith; Richard E. Passingham (Feb 2007). "Reading Hidden Intentions in the Human Brain" (PDF). Current Biology. 17 (4): 323–328. doi:10.1016/j.cub.2006.11.072. PMID 17291759. S2CID 12931103.
- J. D. Haynes; K. Sakai; G. Rees; S. Gilbert; C. Frith; R. E. Passingham (2007). "Reading Hidden Intentions in the Human Brain". Current Biology. 17 (4): 323–328. doi:10.1016/j.cub.2006.11.072.
- Chun Siong Soon; Marcel Brass; Hans-Jochen Heinze; John-Dylan Haynes (Apr 2008). "Unconscious determinants of free decisions in the human brain". Nature Neuroscience. 11 (5): 543–545. doi:10.1038/nn.2112. PMID 18408715. S2CID 2652613.
- C. S. Soon; M. Brass; H. J. Heinze; J. D. Haynes (2008). "Unconscious determinants of free decisions in the human brain". Nature Neuroscience. 11 (5): 543–545. doi:10.1038/nn.2112.
- S. Bode; J. D. Haynes (2009). "Decoding sequential stages of task preparation in the human brain". NeuroImage. 45 (2): 606–613. doi:10.1016/j.neuroimage.2008.11.031.
- A. Tusche; J. D. Haynes (2010). "Neural Responses to Unattended Products Predict Later Consumer Choices". Journal of Neuroscience. 30 (23): 8024–8031. doi:10.1523/JNEUROSCI.0064-10.2010. PMC 6632699. PMID 20534850.
- T. Kahnt; J. Heinzle; S. Q. Park; J. D. Haynes (2010). "The neural code of reward anticipation in human orbitofrontal cortex". Proceedings of the National Academy of Sciences. 107 (13): 6010–6015. doi:10.1073/pnas.0912838107. PMC 2851854. PMID 20231475.
- Y. Chen; P. Namburi; L. T. Elliott; J. Heinzle; C. S. Soon; M. W. L. Chee; J. D. Haynes (2011). "Cortical surface-based searchlight decoding". NeuroImage. 56 (2): 582–592. doi:10.1016/j.neuroimage.2010.07.035.
- C. Bogler; J. D. Haynes (2011). "Decoding Successive Computational Stages of Saliency Processing". Current Biology. 21 (19): 1667–1671. doi:10.1016/j.cub.2011.08.039.
- J. Heinzle; T. Kahnt; J. D. Haynes (2011). "Topographically specific functional connectivity between visual field maps in the human brain". NeuroImage. 56 (3): 1426–1436. doi:10.1016/j.neuroimage.2011.02.077.
- C. Allefeld; J. D. Haynes (2014). "Searchlight-based multi-voxel pattern analysis of fMRI by cross-validated MANOVA". NeuroImage. 89: 345–357. arXiv:1401.4122. doi:10.1016/j.neuroimage.2013.11.043.
- S. Haufe; F. Meinecke; K. Görgen; S. Dähne; J. D. Haynes; B. Blankertz; F. Bießmann (2014). "On the interpretation of weight vectors of linear models in multivariate neuroimaging". NeuroImage. 87: 96–110. doi:10.1016/j.neuroimage.2013.10.067.
- J. D. Haynes (2015). "A Primer on Pattern-Based Approaches to fMRI: Principles, Pitfalls, and Perspectives". Neuron. 87 (2): 257–270. doi:10.1016/j.neuron.2015.05.025.
- M. N. Hebart; K. Görgen; J. D. Haynes (2015). "The Decoding Toolbox (TDT): a versatile software package for multivariate analyses of functional imaging data". Frontiers in Neuroinformatics. 8: 88. doi:10.3389/fninf.2014.00088. PMC 4285115. PMID 25610393.
- J. Soch; J. D. Haynes; C. Allefeld (2016). "How to avoid mismodelling in GLM-based fMRI data analysis: cross-validated Bayesian model selection". NeuroImage. 141: 469–489. doi:10.1016/j.neuroimage.2013.10.067.
- M. Schultze-Kraft; D. Birman; M. Rusconi; C. Allefeld; K. Görgen; S. Dähne; B. Blankertz; J. D. Haynes (2016). "The point of no return in vetoing self-initiated movements". Proceedings of the National Academy of Sciences. 113 (4): 1080–1085. doi:10.1073/pnas.1513569112. PMC 4743787. PMID 26668390.
- Thomas B. Christophel; P. Christiaan Klink; Bernhard Spitzer; Pieter R. Roelfsema; John-Dylan Haynes (2017). "The Distributed Nature of Working Memory". Trends in Cognitive Sciences. 21 (2): 111–124. doi:10.1016/j.tics.2016.12.007. hdl:1871.1/f617c73a-c355-4dde-a4f1-e9cf18b852fd.
- Thomas B. Christophel; P. Iamshchinina; C. Yan; C. Allefeld; John-Dylan Haynes (2018). "Cortical specialization for attended versus unattended working memory". Trends in Cognitive Sciences. 21 (4): 494–496. doi:10.1038/s41593-018-0094-4.
- K. Görgen; M. N. Hebart; C. Allefeld; J. D. Haynes (2018). "The same analysis approach: Practical protection against the pitfalls of novel neuroimaging analysis methods". NeuroImage. 180: 19–30. arXiv:1703.06670. doi:10.1016/j.neuroimage.2017.12.083.
