= Hans Helmut Kornhuber =

German neurologist (1928–2009)

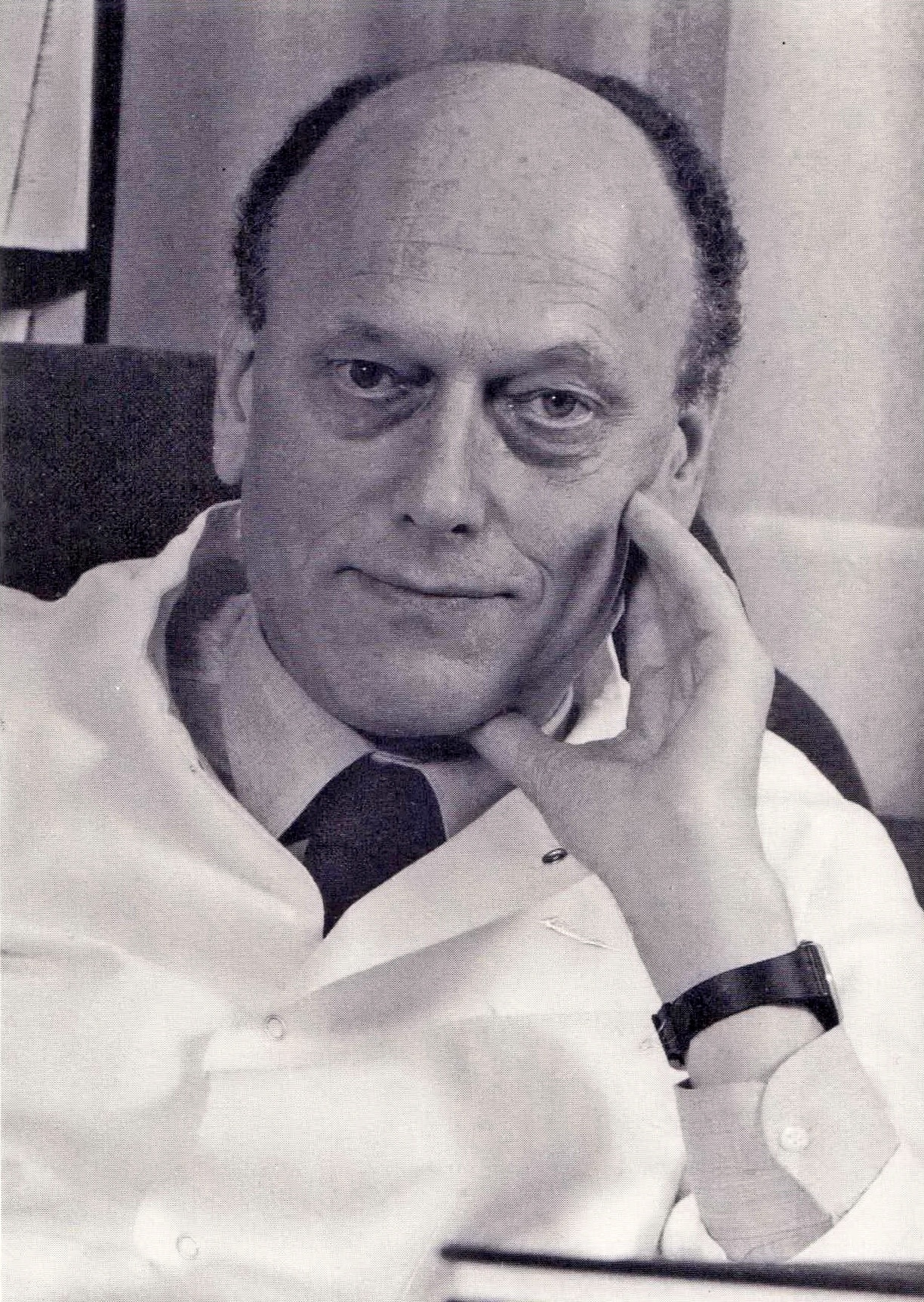
- Born: 24 February 1928; Königsberg, Germany
- Died: 30 October 2009 (aged 81)
- Known for: Bereitschaftspotential
- Awards: Hans-Berger-Award, Hallpike-Nylén-Award, Order of Merit of the Federal Republic of Germany
- Scientific career
- Fields: Neurology, Clinical neurology, Neurophysiology, Clinical neurophysiology, Neuroscience, Clinical neuroscience
- Workplaces: University of Ulm

Hans Helmut Kornhuber (24 February 1928 – 30 October 2009) was a German neurologist and neurophysiologist.

== Biography ==
From 1949 on Kornhuber studied medicine at the Ludwig-Maximilians-Universität München, the University of Göttingen, the University of Freiburg, the University of Basel, and Heidelberg University. In 1955, he was promoted to doctor of medicine in Heidelberg. In 1955, he married Ursula Heesch, they had five children. He absolved his clinical education at the Neurological University Hospital at the University of Freiburg, where he was habilitated in 1963. He spent one and a half research years at the Johns Hopkins University, Baltimore. In 1967, he was appointed the chair of Neurology at the newly founded University of Ulm and there built the Neurological Hospital of the University of Ulm (until 1984 situated in Dietenbronn). In 1996, Kornhuber has been professor emeritus. One of his sons is the Psychiatrist and Psychotherapeut Johannes Kornhuber. Kornhuber saw the achievement of a scientific break through in 1965 with the discovery of the Bereitschaftspotential (or readiness potential), together with his doctoral student Lüder Deecke.

== Scientific contribution ==
In 1965 Kornhuber (together with Lüder Deecke) discovered the Bereitschaftspotential, a brain potential in the EEG which precedes all our willed movements and actions. The publication, even though originally in German, became a citation classic. He spent early interest in epistemology and brain function. He worked on the sensory systems/perception, conducting many experiments at Baltimore with Vernon Benjamin Mountcastle and his team on skin receptors, and also measuring the channel capacity of sensory systems (and consciousness). He conducted his own research into new therapies with particular emphasis on multiple sclerosis, stroke, dementia, movement disorders, etc. He also made contributions for psychiatry, e.g. the glutamate theory. He contributed to Otorhinolaryngology (hand book articles such as Physiology and Clinic of the Vestibular System). Kornhuber also discovered the eye muscle field in the cerebellum.

== Awards and recognition ==
In 1967 Kornhuber received the Hans-Berger-Award of the German EEG society (DGKN) for his discovery of the cerebral foundations of will and purposeful actions (willingness to act). The Bárány Society honored him with the Hallpike-Nylén-Award for his pioneering research on the vestibular system. He was awarded honorary membership by foreign oto-neurological societies. Universities awarded him as honorary professor and honorary doctor (University of Brussels). The Belgian neurophysiological society awarded Kornhuber an honorary membership. The Federal Republic of Germany honoured him for his efforts concerning the rehabilitation of patients with the Order of Merit of the Federal Republic of Germany, and the German Society of Psychiatry honoured him for his research in the field of schizophrenia by awarding him the Kurt-Schneider prize.

== Publications (selected) ==
Scientific articles

- with Richard Jung: Neurophysiologie und Psychophysik des visuellen Systems. Springer, Heidelberg 1961.
- with Lüder Deecke: Hirnpotentialänderungen bei Willkürbewegungen und passiven Bewegungen des Menschen: Bereitschaftspotential und reafferente Potentiale. In: Pflügers Archiv für die gesamte Physiologie des Menschen und der Tiere. Bd. 284 (1965), H. 1, S. 1–17, doi:10.1007/BF00412364, PDF.
- Geist und Freiheit als biologische Probleme. In: Roger Alfred Stamm, Hans Zeier (Hrsg.): Die Psychologie des 20. Jahrhunderts. Band 6: Lorenz und die Folgen. Kindler, Zürich 1978, S. 1122–1130.
- Attention, readiness for action and the stages of voluntary decision. In: Experimental Brain Research. Supplement 9 (1984), S. 420–429.
- Von der Freiheit. In: Manfred Lindauer, Alfred Schöpf (Hrsg.): Wie erkennt der Mensch die Welt? Grundlagen des Erkennens, Fühlens und Handelns. Geistes- und Naturwissenschaftler im Dialog. Klett, Stuttgart 1984.
- Deecke, Lüder (January 22, 1990). "Readiness for movement: The Bereitschaftspotential-Story" (PDF). Current Contents Life Sciences. 33 (4): 14.
- Gehirn, Wille, Freiheit. In: Revue de métaphysique et de morale. Bd. 97 (1992), H. 2, S. 203–223 (JSTOR).
- Alkohol: Auch der „normale" Konsum schadet. Urban & Vogel, Munich 2001.
- Zur Willensfreiheit: On Free Will. In: Fortschritte der Neurologie – Psychiatrie. Bd. 74 (2006), H. 8, S. 427–430, doi:10.1055/s-2006-944233 (positioning against Gerhard Roth and Wolf Singer).
- with Lüder Deecke: Wille und Gehirn. Edition Sirius im Aisthesis-Verlag, Bielefeld/Locarno 2007; 2nd, ed. 2009.

Books

- with Deecke, L (2003) Human freedom, reasoned will, and the brain: The Bereitschaftspotential story. In: M Jahanshahi, M Hallett(Eds) The Bereitschaftspotential, movement-related cortical potentials. Kluwer Academic / Plenum Publishers New York, pp 283–320 ISBN 0-306-47407-7
- with Deecke, L (2009) Wille und Gehirn. 2nd. rev. ed. Edition Sirius im Aisthesis-Verlag, Bielefeld/ Basel 2009, ISBN 978-3-89528-628-5.

== See also ==
- Bereitschaftspotential
- Free will
- Benjamin Libet
