= Supplementary motor area =

Midline region in front of the motor cortex of the brain

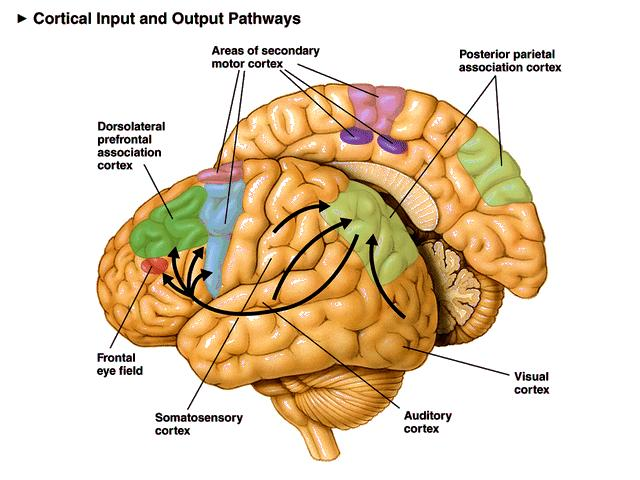
- Some motor areas in the human cortex. The supplementary motor area is shown in pink.

- 3D visualization of the supplementary motor cortex in an average human brain

Identifiers
- NeuroNames: 3176
- FMA: 224858

The supplementary motor area (SMA) is a part of the motor cortex of primates that contributes to the control of movement. It is located on the midline surface of the hemisphere just in front of (anterior to) the primary motor cortex leg representation. In monkeys, the SMA contains a rough map of the body. In humans, the body map is not apparent. Neurons in the SMA project directly to the spinal cord and may play a role in the direct control of movement. Possible functions attributed to the SMA include the postural stabilization of the body, the coordination of both sides of the body such as during bimanual action, the control of movements that are internally generated rather than triggered by sensory events, and the control of sequences of movements. All of these proposed functions remain hypotheses. The precise role or roles of the SMA is not yet known.

For the discovery of the SMA and its relationship to other motor cortical areas, see the main article on the motor cortex.

== Subregions ==
At least six areas are now recognized within the larger region once defined as the SMA. These subdivisions have been studied most extensively in the monkey brain. The most anterior portion is now commonly termed pre-SMA. It has sparse or no connections to the spinal cord or the primary motor cortex and has extensive connectivity with prefrontal areas.

The supplementary eye field (SEF) is a relatively anterior portion of the SMA that, when stimulated, evokes head and eye movements and perhaps movements of the limbs and torso.

Dum and Strick hypothesized on the basis of cytoarchitecture and connections to the spinal cord that the portion of SMA in the cingulate sulcus, on the medial part of the hemisphere, can be split into three separate areas, the cingulate motor areas. The functions of the cingulate motor areas have not yet been systematically studied, though may be involved in emotionally driven behaviours like the limbic laugh.

SMA proper in monkeys has now been confined to a region on the crown of the hemisphere and extending partly onto the medial wall, just anterior to the primary motor leg representation. SMA proper projects directly to the spinal cord and therefore is one of the primary output areas of the cortical motor system.

Recently, Zhang et al. investigated the functional subdivisions of the medial SFC on the basis of whole-brain connectivity characterized from a large resting-state fMRI data set. Other than replicating the boundaries between SMA and preSMA, the current results support a functional difference between the posterior and anterior pre-SMA. In contrast to the posterior pre-SMA, the anterior pre-SMA is connected with most of the prefrontal but not somatomotor areas. Overall, the SMA is strongly connected to the thalamus and epithalamus, the posterior pre-SMA to putamen, pallidum, and STN and anterior pre-SMA to the caudate nucleus, with the caudate showing significant hemispheric asymmetry.

== Functions ==
Penfield and Welch in 1951 first described SMA in the monkey brain and the human brain as a representation of the body on the medial wall of the hemisphere. Woolsey and colleagues in 1952 confirmed SMA in the monkey brain, describing it as a rough somatotopic map with the legs in a posterior location and the face in an anterior location. The representations of different body parts were found to overlap extensively. Stimulation of many sites evoked bilateral movements and sometimes movements of all four limbs. This overlapping somatotopic map in SMA was confirmed by many others.

Four main hypotheses have been proposed for the function of SMA: the control of postural stability during stance or walking, coordinating temporal sequences of actions, bimanual coordination, and the initiation of internally generated as opposed to stimulus driven movement. The data, however, tend not to support an exclusive role of SMA in any one of these functions. Indeed, SMA is demonstrably active during non-sequential, unimanual, and stimulus-cued movements.

In humans, the SMA has been shown to generate the early component of the Bereitschaftspotential (BP) or readiness potential BP1 or BPearly. The role of the SMA was further substantiated by Cunnington et al. 2003, showing that SMA proper and pre-SMA are active prior to volitional movement or action, as well as the cingulate motor area (CMA) and anterior mid-cingulate cortex (aMCC). Recently it has been shown by integrating simultaneously acquired EEG and fMRI that SMA and aMCC have strong reciprocal connections that act to sustain each other’s activity, and that this interaction is mediated during movement preparation according to the Bereitschaftspotential amplitude.

SMA in the monkey brain may emphasize locomotion, especially complex locomotion such as climbing or leaping. This suggestion was based on studies in which stimulation on a behaviorally relevant time scale evoked complex, full body movements that resembled climbing or leaping. This hypothesis is consistent with previous hypotheses, including the involvement of SMA in postural stabilization, in internally generated movements, in bimanual coordination, and in the planning of movement sequences, because all of these functions are heavily recruited in complex locomotion. The locomotion hypothesis is an example of interpreting the motor cortex in terms of the underlying behavioral repertoire from which abstract control functions emerge, an approach emphasized by Graziano and colleagues.

== Additional images ==
Supplementary motor cortex highlighted in green on coronal T1 MRI images

Supplementary motor cortex highlighted in green on sagittal T1 MRI images

Supplementary motor cortex highlighted in green on transversal T1 MRI images
