= Benjamin Libet =

American neuroscientist (1916–2007)

- Born: April 12, 1916; Chicago, Illinois, U.S.
- Died: July 23, 2007 (aged 91); Davis, California, U.S.
- Education: University of Chicago
- Known for: Experimental investigation of human consciousness
- Scientific career
- Fields: Neuroscience
- Workplaces: University of California, San Francisco
- Doctoral advisor: Ralph W. Gerard

Benjamin Libet (/ˈlɪbət/; April 12, 1916 – July 23, 2007) was an American neuroscientist who was a pioneer in the field of human consciousness. Libet was a researcher in the physiology department of the University of California, San Francisco.

== Life ==
Libet was the son of Ukrainian Jewish immigrants. Gamer Libitsky, his paternal grandfather, came to America in 1865 from a town called Brusyliv in Ukraine. His mother, Anna Charovsky, emigrated from Kyiv in 1913. His parents met in Chicago and married in 1915 and had Libet the next year. He had a brother, Meyer, and a sister, Dorothy. Libet attended a public elementary school and John Marshall High School. In 1939, Libet graduated from the University of Chicago, where he studied with Ralph W. Gerard.

In the 1970s, Libet was involved in research into neural activity and sensation thresholds. His initial investigations involved determining how much activation at specific sites in the brain was required to trigger artificial somatic sensations, relying on routine psychophysical procedures. This work soon crossed into an investigation into human consciousness; his most famous experiment was meant to demonstrate that the unconscious electrical processes in the brain called Bereitschaftspotential (or readiness potential) discovered by Lüder Deecke and Hans Helmut Kornhuber in 1965 precede conscious decisions to perform volitional, spontaneous acts, implying that unconscious neuronal processes precede and potentially cause volitional acts which are retrospectively felt to be consciously motivated by the subject. The experiment has caused controversy not only because it challenges the belief in free will, but also due to a criticism of its implicit assumptions.

== Volitional acts and readiness potential ==
=== Equipment ===
To gauge the relation between unconscious readiness potential and subjective feelings of volition and action, Libet required an objective method of marking the subject's conscious experience of the will to perform an action in time, and afterward comparing this information with data recording the brain's electrical activity during the same interval. For this, Libet required specialized pieces of equipment.

The first of these was the cathode ray oscilloscope, an instrument typically used to graph the amplitude and frequency of electrical signals. With a few adjustments, however, the oscilloscope could be made to act as a timer: instead of displaying a series of waves, the output was a single dot that could be made to travel in a circular motion, similar to the movements of a second hand around a clock face. This timer was set so that the time it took for the dot to travel between intervals marked on the oscilloscope was approximately forty-three milliseconds. As the angular velocity of the dot remained constant, any change in distance could easily be converted into the time it took to travel that distance.

To monitor brain activity during the same period, Libet used an electroencephalogram (EEG). The EEG uses small electrodes placed at various points on the scalp that measure neuronal activity in the cortex, the outermost portion of the brain, which is associated with higher cognition. The transmission of electrical signals across regions of the cortex causes differences in measured voltage across EEG electrodes. These differences in voltage reflect changes in neuronal activity in specific areas of the cortex.

To measure the actual time of the voluntary motor act, an electromyograph (EMG) recorded the muscle movement using electrodes on the skin over the activated muscle of the forearm. The EMG time was taken as the zero time relative to which all other times were calculated.

=== Methods ===
Researchers carrying out Libet's procedure would ask each participant to sit at a desk in front of the oscilloscope timer. They would affix the EEG electrodes to the participant's scalp, and would then instruct the subject to carry out some small, simple motor activity, such as pressing a button, or flexing a finger or wrist, within a certain time frame. No limits were placed on the number of times the subject could perform the action within this period.

Libet's experiment: 0 repose 1 (−500 ms) EEG measures Readiness potential 2 (−200 ms) Person notes the position of the dot when decides 3 ( 0 ms) Act

During the experiment, the subject would be asked to note the position of the dot on the oscilloscope timer when "he/she was first aware of the wish or urge to act" (control tests with Libet's equipment demonstrated a comfortable margin of error of only −50 milliseconds). Pressing the button also recorded the position of the dot on the oscillator, this time electronically. By comparing the marked time of the button's pushing and the subject's conscious decision to act, researchers were able to calculate the total time of the trial from the subject's initial volition through to the resultant action. On average, approximately two hundred milliseconds elapsed between the first appearance of conscious will to press the button and the act of pressing it.

Researchers also analyzed EEG recordings for each trial with respect to the timing of the action. It was noted that brain activity involved in the initiation of the action, primarily centered in the secondary motor cortex, occurred, on average, approximately five hundred milliseconds before the trial ended with the pushing of the button. That is to say, researchers recorded mounting brain activity related to the resultant action as many as three hundred milliseconds before subjects reported the first awareness of conscious will to act. In other words, apparently conscious decisions to act were preceded by an unconscious buildup of electrical activity within the brain – the change in EEG signals reflecting this buildup came to be called Bereitschaftspotential or readiness potential. As of 2008, the upcoming outcome of a decision could be found in study of the brain activity in the prefrontal and parietal cortex up to 7 seconds before the subject was aware of their decision. Since then, even the readiness potential argument has been refuted.

== Implications of Libet's experiments ==
There is no majority agreement about the interpretation or the significance of Libet's experiments. However, Libet's experiments suggest to some that unconscious processes in the brain are the true initiator of volitional acts, and free will therefore plays no part in their initiation. If unconscious brain processes have already taken steps to initiate an action before consciousness is aware of any desire to perform it, the causal role of consciousness in volition is all but eliminated, according to this interpretation. For instance, Susan Blackmore's interpretation is "that conscious experience takes some time to build up and is much too slow to be responsible for making things happen".

Such a conclusion would be overdrawn as in a subsequent run of experiments, Libet found that even after the awareness of the decision to push the button had happened, people still had the capability to veto the decision and not to push the button. So they still had the capability to refrain from the decision that had earlier been made. Some therefore take this brain impulse to push the button to suggest just a readiness potential which the subject may either then go along with or may veto. So the person still has power over his or her decision.

For this reason, Libet himself regards his experimental results to be entirely compatible with the notion of free will. He finds that conscious volition is exercised in the form of 'the power of veto' (sometimes called "free won't"); the idea that conscious acquiescence is required to allow the unconscious buildup of the readiness potential to be actualized as a movement. While consciousness plays no part in the instigation of volitional acts, Libet suggested that it may still have a part to play in suppressing or withholding certain acts instigated by the unconscious. Libet noted that everyone has experienced the withholding from performing an unconscious urge. Since the subjective experience of the conscious will to act preceded the action by only 200 milliseconds, this leaves consciousness only 100–150 milliseconds to veto an action (this is because the final 20 milliseconds prior to an act are occupied by the activation of the spinal motor neurons by the primary motor cortex, and the margin of error indicated by tests utilizing the oscillator must also be considered). However, Max Velmans has argued: "Libet has shown that the experienced intention to perform an act is preceded by cerebral initiation. Why should the experienced decision to veto that intention, or to actively or passively promote its completion, be any different?"

In a study published in 2012, Aaron Schurger, Jacobo D. Sitt, and Stanislas Dehaene proposed that the occurrence of the readiness potentials observed in Libet-type experiments is stochastically occasioned by ongoing spontaneous subthreshold fluctuations in neural activity, rather than an unconscious goal-directed operation.

In an empirical study in 2019, researchers found that readiness potentials were absent for deliberate decisions, and preceded arbitrary decisions only.

Neurosurgeon Rickard L Sjoberg, studying patients after neurosurgical resections of the brain area implicated in the experiment found that whereas their ability to execute voluntary actions was transiently but severely impacted, their subjective sense of volition was not.

Libet's experiments have received both support and opposition from other research related to the neuroscience of free will.

=== Is spontaneous wrist movement the paradigm for free action? ===
When considering the implications of Libet's studies on free will and responsibility, one common reaction is to qualify the scope of the kinds of decisions Libet's findings apply to. Libet's experiments pertain to spontaneous and arbitrary wrist movement, and not to decisions that involve conscious deliberation. Libet himself affirmed this: "In those voluntary actions that are not 'spontaneous' and quickly performed, that is, in those in which conscious deliberation (of whether to act or of what alternative choice of action to take) precedes the act, the possibilities for conscious initiation and control would not be excluded by the present evidence".

Some argue that this kind of decision is not the appropriate target for discussions of freedom, which is centered around questions of responsibility. For example, Roskies argues that the kind of decisions relevant to questions of responsibility are those governed by reason or conscious rejection of reasons. In most cases where people are held accountable for their actions, what is under consideration is not a bodily movement in isolation, but actions as part of the result of prior conscious deliberations. Thus, according to this view Libet's findings does not deliver any radical implications for responsibility in general.

=== Reactions by dualist philosophers ===
The German philosopher Uwe Meixner commented, "For making an informed decision, the self needs to be conscious of the facts relevant to the decision prior to making the decision; but...the self certainly does not need to be conscious of making the decision at the very same time it makes it...the consciousness of a state of affairs P being (presently) the case is always somewhat later than the actual fact of P's being the case...".

When one is speaking to another individual, as a result of the limited velocity of light signals and the limited velocity of sound waves and the limited velocity of nerve signals, what one is experiencing as now is always slightly in the past. No person ever has a definite present awareness of what is occurring around them. There is a small time delay due to the limited velocity of these many different signals that is indiscernible to people because it is extremely short. Meixner also says, "it is hardly surprising that the consciousness of making a decision is no exception to this general rule, which is due to the dependence of consciousness on neurophysiology".

Just as nothing that is actually presently there can be observed because of the limited velocity of light but events as they are just a little in the past can be observed, in the same way people do not have a consciousness of their own decisions simultaneously with their making them but they have it undetectedly afterwards.

If the mind has the power to think without being causally determined, then all it requires to do in order to make accountable, knowledgeable, free decisions is consciousness of the pertinent facts before its decision making. However, the mind does not require to be aware or conscious of the decision itself at the same it makes that decision.

It has been suggested that consciousness is merely a side-effect of neuronal functions, an epiphenomenon of brain states (see also: Epiphenomenalism). Libet's experiments have been proffered in support of this theory; our reports of conscious instigation of our own acts are, in this view, a mistake of retrospection. However, some dualist philosophers have disputed this conclusion:

In short, the [neuronal] causes and correlates of conscious experience should not be confused with their ontology ... the only evidence about what conscious experiences are like comes from first-person sources, which consistently suggest consciousness to be something other than or additional to neuronal activity.

A more general criticism from a dualist-interactionist perspective has been raised by Alexander Batthyany who points out that Libet asked his subjects to merely "let the urge [to move] appear on its own at any time without any pre-planning or concentration on when to act". According to Batthyany, neither reductionist nor non-reductionist agency theories claim that urges which appear on their own are suitable examples of (allegedly) consciously caused events because one cannot passively wait for an urge to occur while at the same time being the one who is consciously bringing it about. Libet's results thus cannot be interpreted to provide empirical evidence in favour of agency reductionism, since non-reductionist theories, even including dualist interactionism, would predict the very same experimental results.

=== Timing issues ===
American philosopher, writer, and cognitive scientist Daniel Dennett argues that no clear conclusion about volition can be derived from Libet's experiment because of ambiguities in the timings of the different events involved. Libet tells when the readiness potential occurs objectively, using electrodes, but relies on the subject reporting the position of the hand of a clock to determine when the conscious decision was made. As Dennett points out, this is only a report of where it seems to the subject that various things come together, not of the objective time at which they actually occur:

Suppose Libet knows that your readiness potential peaked at millisecond 6,810 of the experimental trial, and the clock dot was straight down (which is what you reported you saw) at millisecond 7,005. How many milliseconds should he have to add to this number to get the time you were conscious of it? The light gets from your clock face to your eyeball almost instantaneously, but the path of the signals from retina through lateral geniculate nucleus to striate cortex takes 5 to 10 milliseconds—a paltry fraction of the 300 milliseconds offset, but how much longer does it take them to get to you. (Or are you located in the striate cortex?) The visual signals have to be processed before they arrive at wherever they need to arrive for you to make a conscious decision of simultaneity. Libet's method presupposes, in short, that we can locate the intersection of two trajectories:

- the rising-to-consciousness of signals representing the decision to flick
- the rising to consciousness of signals representing successive clock-face orientations

so that these events occur side-by-side as it were in place where their simultaneity can be noted.

=== Subjective backward referral or "antedating" of sensory experience ===
Libet's early theory, resting on study of stimuli and sensation, was found bizarre by some commentators, including Patricia Churchland, due to the apparent idea of backward causation. Libet argued that data suggested that we retrospectively "antedate" the beginning of a sensation to the moment of the primary neuronal response. People interpreted Libet's work on stimulus and sensation in a number of different ways. John Eccles presented Libet's work as suggesting a backward step in time made by a non-physical mind. Edoardo Bisiach (1988) described Eccles as tendentious, but commented:

This is indeed the conclusion that the authors (Libet, et al.) themselves seem to be willing to force upon the reader. ... They dispute an alternative explanation, suggested by Mackay in a discussion with Libet (1979, p. 219) to the effect that 'the subjective referral backwards in time may be due to an illusory judgment made by the subject when he reports the timings', and more significant, Libet, et al. (1979, p. 220) hint at 'serious though not insurmountable difficulties' for the identity theory (of mind and matter) caused by their data.

Libet later concluded that there appeared to be "no neural mechanism that could be viewed as directly mediating or accounting for" the subjective sensory referrals backward in time (emphasis Libet's). Libet postulated that the primary evoked potential (EP) serves as a "time marker". The EP is a sharp positive potential appearing in the appropriate sensory region of the brain about 25 milliseconds after a skin stimulus. Libet's experiments demonstrated that there is an automatic subjective referral of the conscious experience backwards in time to this time marker. The skin sensation does not enter our conscious awareness until about 500 milliseconds after the skin stimulus, but we subjectively feel that the sensation occurred at the time of the stimulus.

For Libet, these subjective referrals would appear to be purely a mental function with no corresponding neural basis in the brain. Indeed, this suggestion can be more broadly generalized:

The transformation from neuronal patterns to a subjective representation would appear to develop in a mental sphere that has emerged from that neuronal pattern. ... My view of mental subjective function is that it is an emergent property of appropriate brain functions. The conscious mental cannot exist without the brain processes that give rise to it. However, having emerged from brain activities as a unique 'property' of that physical system, the mental can exhibit phenomena not evident in the neural brain that produced it.

== Conscious mental field theory ==
In the later part of his career, Libet proposed a theory of the conscious mental field (CMF) to explain how the mental arises from the physical brain. The two main motivations prompting this proposal were: (1) the phenomenon of the unity of subjective conscious experience and (2) the phenomenon that conscious mental function appears to influence nerve cell activity.

Regarding the unity of conscious experience, it was increasingly evident to Libet that many functions of the cortex are localized, even to a microscopic level in a region of the brain, and yet the conscious experiences related to these areas are integrated and unified. We do not experience an infinite array of individual events but rather a unitary integrated consciousness, for example, with no gaps in spatial and colored images. For Libet, some unifying process or phenomenon likely mediates the transformation of localized, particularized neuronal representations into our unified conscious experience. This process seemed to be best accountable in a mental sphere that appears to emerge from the neural events, namely, the conscious mental field.

The CMF is the mediator between the physical activities of nerve cells and the emergence of subjective experience. Thus the CMF is the entity in which unified subjective experience is present and provides the causal ability to affect or alter some neuronal functions. Libet proposed the CMF as a "property" of an emergent phenomenon of the brain; it does not exist without the brain but emerges from the appropriate system of neural activity. This proposal is related to electromagnetic theories of consciousness.

To test the proposed causal ability of the CMF to affect or alter neuronal functions, Libet proposed an experimental design, which would surgically isolate a slab of cerebral cortex (in a patient for whom such a procedure was therapeutically required). If electrical stimulation of the isolated cortex can elicit an introspective report by the subject, the CMF must be able to activate appropriate cerebral areas in order to produce the verbal report. This result would demonstrate directly that a conscious mental field could affect neuronal functions in a way that would account for the activity of the conscious will. Detailed description of the proposed experimental test is as follows:

A small slab of sensory cortex (subserving any modality) is neuronally isolated but kept viable by making all the cortical cuts subpially. This allows the blood vessels in the pia to project into the isolated slab and provide blood flow from the arterial branches that dip vertically into the cortex. The prediction is that electrical stimulation of the sensory slab will produce a subjective response reportable by the subject. That is, activity in the isolated slab can contribute by producing its own portion of the CMF.

Libet further elaborated on CMF:

The CMF is not a Cartesian dualistic phenomenon; it is not separable from the brain. Rather, it is proposed to be a localizable system property produced by appropriate neuronal activities, and it cannot exist without them. Again, it is not a ghost in the machine. But, as a system produced by billions of nerve cell actions, it can have properties not directly predictable from these neuronal activities. It is a non-physical phenomenon, like the subjective experience that it represents. The process by which the CMF arises from its contributing elements is not describable. It must simply be regarded as a new fundamental given phenomenon in nature, which is different from other fundamental givens, like gravity or electromagnetism.

== Tributes ==
Robert W. Doty, professor of Neurobiology and Anatomy at the University of Rochester:

Benjamin Libet's discoveries are of extraordinary interest. His is almost the only approach yet to yield any credible evidence of how conscious awareness is produced by the brain. Libet's work is unique, and speaks to questions asked by all humankind.

Susan J. Blackmore, visiting lecturer at the University of the West of England, Bristol:

Many philosophers and scientists have argued that free will is an illusion. Unlike all of them, Benjamin Libet found a way to test it.

== In popular culture ==
Libet and his research into the delay is referenced several times in song titles by musical artist the Caretaker, who was influenced by some of his work. The 2011 album An Empty Bliss Beyond This World contains a song called "Libet's Delay", which went on to be one of the more popular tracks from it. The Caretaker's final release, Everywhere at the End of Time, contains the songs "Back There Benjamin," (Referring to his first name) "Libet's All Joyful Camaraderie" and "Libet Delay", with the latter being a far more twisted, distorted version of the original "Libet's Delay". The 2019 extra album Everywhere, an Empty Bliss also includes a track named "Benjamin Beyond Bliss".
