= Logogen model =

Model of speech recognition

The logogen model of 1969 is a model of speech recognition that uses units called "logogens" to explain how humans comprehend spoken or written words. Logogens are a vast number of specialized recognition units, each able to recognize one specific word. This model provides for the effects of context on word recognition.

== Overview ==
The word logogen can be traced back to the Greek-language word logos, which means "word", and genus, which means "birth".

British scientist John Morton's logogen model was designed to explain word recognition using a new type of unit known as a logogen. A critical element of this theory is the involvement of lexicons, or specialized aspects of memory that include semantic and phonemic information about each item that is contained in memory. A given lexicon consists of many smaller, abstract items known as logogens.

Logogens contain a variety of properties about given word such as their appearance, sound, and meaning. Logogens do not store words within themselves, but rather they store information that is specifically necessary for retrieval of whatever word is being searched for. A given logogen will become activated by psychological stimuli or contextual information (words) that is consistent with the properties of that specific logogen and when the logogen's activation level rises to or above its threshold level, the pronunciation of the given word is sent to the output system.

Certain stimuli can affect the activation levels of more than one word at a time, usually involving words that are similar to one another. When this occurs, whichever of the words' activation levels reaches the threshold level, it is that word that is then sent to the output system with the subject remaining unaware of any partially excited logogens.

This assumption was made by Marslen-Wilson and Welch (1978), who added to the model some assumptions of their own in order to account for their experimental results. They also assumed that the analysis of phonetic input can only become available to other parts of the system by process of how the input affects the logogen system. Finally, Marslen-Wilson and Welch assume that the first syllable of a given word will increase the activation level of a given logogen more than those of the latter syllables, which supported the data found at the time.

== Analysis ==
The logogen model can be used to help linguists explain particular occurrences in the human language. The most-helpful application of the model is to show how one accesses words and their meanings in the lexicon.

The word-frequency effect is best explained by the logogen model in that words (or logogens) that have a higher frequency (or are more common) have a lower threshold. This means that they require less perceptual power in the brain to be recognized and decoded from the lexicon and are recognized faster than those words that are less common. Also, with high-frequency words, the recovery from lowering the item's threshold is less fulfilled compared to low-frequency words so less sensory information is needed for that particular item's recognition. There are ways to lower thresholds, such as repetition and semantic priming. Also, each time a word is encountered through these methods, the threshold for that word is temporarily lowered partially because of its recovering ability. This model also conveys that specific concrete words are recalled better because they use images and logogens, whereas abstract words are not as easily recalled well because they only use logogens, hence showing the difference in thresholds between these two types of words.

At the time of its conception, Morton's logogen model was one of the most influential models in springing up other parallel word access models and served as the essential basis for these subsequent models. Morton's model also strongly influenced other contemporary theories on lexical access.

However, despite the advantages that the logogen theory presents, it also displays some negative facets. First and foremost, the logogen model does not explain all occurrences in language, such as the introduction of new words or non-words into a person's lexicon. Also, because of the distinctive model application, it may vary in its effectiveness in different languages.

== Criticisms ==
While this model does a reasonable job of understanding the underlying semantics of many aspects in psycholinguistics, there are some flaws that have been pointed out in the logogen model.

It has been argued that the prior stimulus patterns that have been seen in the logogen theory are not centrally localized in the logogen itself but are actually distributed throughout the different pathways over which the stimulus is being processed. What this directs at is that the notion and proliferation of logogens was due to modality. In essence, the logogen is unnecessary in the idea of attaining the title of being a recognition unit because of the variety of pathways that it is open to, not just logogens.

Another criticism has been that this model essentially ignores larger and more critical structures in language and phonetics such as the different syntactic rules or grammatical construction that innately exists in language. Since this model overtly limits itself to the scope of lexical access then this model is seen as biased and misunderstood. To many psychologists, the logogen model does not meet the functional or representational adequacy that a theory should include to sufficiently comprehend language.

Also, another criticism is that the logogen theory was supposed to predict that stimulus degradation should affect priming and word frequency in humans. However, many psychologists have conducted studies and researched the model to show that only priming and not word frequency is interacted with stimulus degradation. Priming is supposed to deteriorate a stimulus because it postulates that the semantic characteristics of previously known words are fed back into the detector of a person which in turn raises the threshold of related items. In word frequency, stimulus degradation is supposed to occur because it postulates that familiar words have lower thresholds than their low-frequency counterparts. However, in studies, priming is the only structure that does show observable and notable stimulus decadence.

Even though the logogen theory has many unfilled holes, Morton was a revolutionary of his field whose speculation and research has opened up a remarkable era of psycholinguistics.

== Other models to consider ==
- cohort model – This model was proposed by Marslen-Wilson and was designed specifically to account for auditory word recognition. It works by breaking the word down and states that when a word is heard all words that begin with the first sound of the target word are activated. This set of words is considered the cohort. Once the first cohort has been activated, the other information, or sounds in the word narrow down the choices. The person recognizes the word when you are left with a single choice; this is considered the "recognition point".
- checking model – This model was developed by Norris in 1986. In this particular model, he took the approach that any word that partially matches the input is analyzed and checked to see if it fits with the context of the situation.
- interactive-activation model – This model is considered a connectionist model. Proposed by McClelland and Rumelhart in the 1981 to 1982 period, it is based around nodes, which are visual features, and positions of letters within a given word. They also act as word detectors which have inhibitory and excitatory connections between them. This model starts with first letter and suggests that all the words with that first letter are activated at first and then going through the word one can determine what the word is they are looking at. The main principle is that mental phenomena can be described by interconnected networks of simple units.
- verification model – The model was developed by Curtis Becker in 1970. The main idea is that a small number of candidates that are activated in parallel are subject to a serial-verification process. This model starts the word-recognition process with a basic representation of the stimulus. Then, sensory trace, consisting of line features is used to activate word detectors. When an acceptable number of detectors are activated these are used to generate a search set. These items are drawn from the lexicon on the basis of similarity to the sensory trace, which help with the identity of the stimulus. Then, in a serial process the candidates are compared to the representation of the sensory-trace input.

== Related concepts ==
- word frequency – This is the belief that the speed and accuracy with which a word is recognized is related to how frequently the word occurs in our language. Each logogen has a threshold (for identification) and words with higher frequencies have lower thresholds. Words with higher frequencies also require less sensory evidence. (Morrison & Ellis, 1995)
- age of acquisition – This term generally refers to the age at which a concept or skills is learned. The most studied however, is language acquisition. Words that are learned earlier in life are more quickly recognized and used more frequently than those learned later. This is the reason many hypothesize that children are better at learning a second language than adults (Morrison & Ellis, 2005). There are various hypotheses for why this is so. One is the "phonological completeness hypothesis" proposed by Brown and Watson in 1989. This states that the reason earlier words are learned quicker is because they are stored holistically. Later in life, new words are stored in fragments. They are recalled slowly because the fragments most be placed together.
- repetition priming – Non-conscious form of memory in which neural activity is reduced once exposure has occurred repeatedly. A more recognizable word will result in a quicker-response time.
