= Byki =

Byki may refer to:

- Byki, Łódź Voivodeship, in central Poland
- Byki, Kursk Oblast, Russia
- Before You Know It (software)

== See also ==
- Before You Know It (disambiguation)
