= Perceptual learning =

Process of learning better perception skills

Perceptual learning is the learning of perception skills, such as differentiating two musical tones from one another or categorizations of spatial and temporal patterns relevant to real-world expertise. Examples of this may include reading, seeing relations among chess pieces, and knowing whether or not an X-ray image shows a tumor.

Sensory modalities may include visual, auditory, tactile, olfactory, and taste. Perceptual learning forms important foundations of complex cognitive processes (i.e., language) and interacts with other kinds of learning to produce perceptual expertise. Underlying perceptual learning are changes in the neural circuitry. The ability for perceptual learning is retained throughout life.

== Basic sensory discrimination ==
Laboratory studies reported many examples of dramatic improvements in sensitivities from appropriately structured perceptual learning tasks. In visual Vernier acuity tasks, observers judge whether one line is displaced above or below a second line. Untrained observers are often already very good with this task, but after training, observers' threshold has been shown to improve as much as 6 fold. Similar improvements have been found for visual motion discrimination and orientation sensitivity. In visual search tasks, observers are asked to find a target object hidden among distractors or in noise. Studies of perceptual learning with visual search show that experience leads to great gains in sensitivity and speed. In one study by Karni and Sagi, the time it took for subjects to search for an oblique line among a field of horizontal lines was found to improve dramatically, from about 200ms in one session to about 50ms in a later session. With appropriate practice, visual search can become automatic and very efficient, such that observers do not need more time to search when there are more items present on the search field. Tactile perceptual learning has been demonstrated on spatial acuity tasks such as tactile grating orientation discrimination, and on vibrotactile perceptual tasks such as frequency discrimination; tactile learning on these tasks has been found to transfer from trained to untrained fingers. Practice with Braille reading and daily reliance on the sense of touch may underlie the enhancement in tactile spatial acuity of blind compared to sighted individuals.

== In the natural world ==
Perceptual learning is prevalent and occurs continuously in everyday life. "Experience shapes the way people see and hear." Experience provides the sensory input to our perceptions as well as knowledge about identities. When people are less knowledgeable about different races and cultures, people develop stereotypes. Perceptual learning is a more in-depth relationship between experience and perception. Different perceptions of the same sensory input may arise in individuals with different experiences or training. This leads to important issues about the ontology of sensory experience, the relationship between cognition and perception.

An example of this is money. Every day we look at money and we can look at it and know what it is but when you are asked to find the correct coin in similar coins that have slight differences we may have a problem finding the difference. This is because we see it every day but we are not directly trying to find a difference. Learning to perceive differences and similarities among stimuli based on exposure to the stimuli. A study conducted by Gibson's in 1955 illustrates how exposure to stimuli can affect how well we learn details for different stimuli.

As our perceptual system adapts to the natural world, we become better at discriminating between different stimuli when they belong to different categories than when they belong to the same category. We also tend to become less sensitive to the differences between two instances of the same category. These effects are described as the result of categorical perception. Categorical perception effects do not transfer across domains.

Infants, when different sounds belong to the same phonetic category in their native language, tend to lose sensitivity to differences between speech sounds by 10 months of age. They learn to pay attention to salient differences between native phonetic categories, and ignore the less language-relevant ones. In chess, expert chess players encode larger chunks of positions and relations on the board and require fewer exposures to fully recreate a chess board. This is not due to their possessing superior visual skill, but rather to their advanced extraction of structural patterns specific to chess.

When a woman has a baby, shortly after the baby's birth she will be able to decipher the difference in her baby's cry. This is because she is becoming more sensitive to the differences. She can tell what cry is because they are hungry, need to be changed, etc.

Extensive practice reading in English leads to extraction and rapid processing of the structural regularities of English spelling patterns. The word superiority effect demonstrates this—people are often much faster at recognizing words than individual letters.

In speech phonemes, observers who listen to a continuum of equally spaced consonant-vowel syllables going from /be/ to /de/ are much quicker to indicate that two syllables are different when they belonged to different phonemic categories than when they were two variants of the same phoneme, even when physical differences were equated between each pair of syllables.

Other examples of perceptual learning in the natural world include the ability to distinguish between relative pitches in music, identify tumors in x-rays, sort day-old chicks by gender, taste the subtle differences between beers or wines, identify faces as belonging to different races, detect the features that distinguish familiar faces, discriminate between two bird species ("great blue crown heron" and "chipping sparrow"), and attend selectively to the hue, saturation and brightness values that comprise a color definition.

== Brief history ==
The prevalent idiom that "practice makes perfect" captures the essence of the ability to reach impressive perceptual expertise. This has been demonstrated for centuries and through extensive amounts of practice in skills such as wine tasting, fabric evaluation, or musical preference. The first documented report, dating to the mid-19th century, is the earliest example of tactile training aimed at decreasing the minimal distance at which individuals can discriminate whether one or two points on their skin have been touched. It was found that this distance (JND, Just Noticeable Difference) decreases dramatically with practice, and that this improvement is at least partially retained on subsequent days. Moreover, this improvement is at least partially specific to the trained skin area. A particularly dramatic improvement was found for skin positions at which initial discrimination was very crude (e.g. on the back), though training could not bring the JND of initially crude areas down to that of initially accurate ones (e.g. finger tips). William James devoted a section in his Principles of Psychology (1890/1950) to "the improvement in discrimination by practice". He noted examples and emphasized the importance of perceptual learning for expertise. In 1918, Clark L. Hull, a noted learning theorist, trained human participants to learn to categorize deformed Chinese characters into categories. For each category, he used 6 instances that shared some invariant structural property. People learned to associate a sound as the name of each category, and more importantly, they were able to classify novel characters accurately. This ability to extract invariances from instances and apply them to classify new instances marked this study as a perceptual learning experiment. It was not until 1969, however, that Eleanor Gibson published her seminal book The Principles of Perceptual learning and Development and defined the modern field of perceptual learning. She established the study of perceptual learning as an inquiry into the behavior and mechanism of perceptual change. By the mid-1970s, however, this area was in a state of dormancy due to a shift in focus to perceptual and cognitive development in infancy. Much of the scientific community tended to underestimate the impact of learning compared with innate mechanisms. Thus, most of this research focused on characterizing basic perceptual capacities of young infants rather than on perceptual learning processes.

Since the mid-1980s, there has been a new wave of interest in perceptual learning due to findings of cortical plasticity at the lowest sensory levels of sensory systems. Our increased understanding of the physiology and anatomy of our cortical systems has been used to connect the behavioral improvement to the underlying cortical areas. This trend began with earlier findings of Hubel and Wiesel that perceptual representations at sensory areas of the cortex are substantially modified during a short ("critical") period immediately following birth. Merzenich, Kaas and colleagues showed that though neuroplasticity is diminished, it is not eliminated when the critical period ends. Thus, when the external pattern of stimulation is substantially modified, neuronal representations in lower-level (e.g. primary) sensory areas are also modified. Research in this period centered on basic sensory discriminations, where remarkable improvements were found on almost any sensory task through discrimination practice. Following training, subjects were tested with novel conditions and learning transfer was assessed. This work departed from earlier work on perceptual learning, which spanned different tasks and levels.

A question still debated today is to what extent improvements from perceptual learning stems from peripheral modifications compared with improvement in higher-level readout stages. Early interpretations, such as that suggested by William James, attributed it to higher-level categorization mechanisms whereby initially blurred differences are gradually associated with distinctively different labels. The work focused on basic sensory discrimination, however, suggests that the effects of perceptual learning are specific to changes in low-levels of the sensory nervous system (i.e., primary sensory cortices). More recently, research suggest that perceptual learning processes are multilevel and flexible. This cycles back to the earlier Gibsonian view that low-level learning effects are modulated by high-level factors, and suggests that improvement in information extraction may not involve only low-level sensory coding but also apprehension of relatively abstract structure and relations in time and space.

Within the past decade, researchers have sought a more unified understanding of perceptual learning and worked to apply these principles to improve perceptual learning in applied domains.

== Characteristics ==
=== Discovery and fluency effects ===
Perceptual learning effects can be organized into two broad categories: discovery effects and fluency effects. Discovery effects involve some change in the bases of response such as in selecting new information relevant for the task, amplifying relevant information or suppressing irrelevant information. Experts extract larger "chunks" of information and discover high-order relations and structures in their domains of expertise that are invisible to novices. Fluency effects involve changes in the ease of extraction. Not only can experts process high-order information, they do so with great speed and low attentional load. Discovery and fluency effects work together so that as the discovery structures becomes more automatic, attentional resources are conserved for discovery of new relations and for high-level thinking and problem-solving.

=== The role of attention ===
William James (Principles of Psychology, 1890) asserted that "My experience is what I agree to attend to. Only those items which I notice shape my mind - without selective interest, experience is an utter chaos.". His view was extreme, yet its gist was largely supported by subsequent behavioral and physiological studies. Mere exposure does not seem to suffice for acquiring expertise.

Indeed, a relevant signal in a given behavioral condition may be considered noise in another. For example, when presented with two similar stimuli, one might endeavor to study the differences between their representations in order to improve one's ability to discriminate between them, or one may instead concentrate on the similarities to improve one's ability to identify both as belonging to the same category. A specific difference between them could be considered 'signal' in the first case and 'noise' in the second case. Thus, as we adapt to tasks and environments, we pay increasingly more attention to the perceptual features that are relevant and important for the task at hand, and at the same time, less attention to the irrelevant features. This mechanism is called attentional weighting.

However, recent studies suggest that perceptual learning occurs without selective attention. Studies of such task-irrelevant perceptual learning (TIPL) show that the degree of TIPL is similar to that found through direct training procedures. TIPL for a stimulus depends on the relationship between that stimulus and important task events or upon stimulus reward contingencies. It has thus been suggested that learning (of task irrelevant stimuli) is contingent upon spatially diffusive learning signals. Similar effects, but upon a shorter time scale, have been found for memory processes and in some cases is called attentional boosting. Thus, when an important (alerting) event occurs, learning may also affect concurrent, non-attended and non-salient stimuli.

=== Time course of perceptual learning ===
The time course of perceptual learning varies from one participant to another. Perceptual learning occurs not only within the first training session but also between sessions. Fast learning (i.e., within-first-session learning) and slow learning (i.e., between-session learning) involves different changes in the human adult brain. While the fast learning effects can only be retained for a short term of several days, the slow learning effects can be preserved for a long term over several months.

== Explanations and models ==
=== Receptive field modification ===
Research on basic sensory discriminations often show that perceptual learning effects are specific to the trained task or stimulus. Many researchers take this to suggest that perceptual learning may work by modifying the receptive fields of the cells (e.g., V1 and V2 cells) that initially encode the stimulus. For example, individual cells could adapt to become more sensitive to important features, effectively recruiting more cells for a particular purpose, making some cells more specifically tuned for the task at hand. Evidence for receptive field change has been found using single-cell recording techniques in primates in both tactile and auditory domains.

However, not all perceptual learning tasks are specific to the trained stimuli or tasks. Sireteanu and Rettenback discussed discrimination learning effects that generalize across eyes, retinal locations and tasks. Ahissar and Hochstein used visual search to show that learning to detect a single line element hidden in an array of differently-oriented line segments could generalize to positions at which the target was never presented. In human vision, not enough receptive field modification has been found in early visual areas to explain perceptual learning. Training that produces large behavioral changes such as improvements in discrimination does not produce changes in receptive fields. In studies where changes have been found, the changes are too small to explain changes in behavior.

=== Reverse hierarchy theory ===
The Reverse Hierarchy Theory (RHT), proposed by Ahissar & Hochstein, aims to link between learning dynamics and specificity and the underlying neuronal sites. RHT proposes that naïve performance is based on responses at high-level cortical areas, where crude, categorical level representations of the environment are represented. Hence initial learning stages involve understanding global aspects of the task. Subsequent practice may yield better perceptual resolution as a consequence of accessing lower-level information via the feedback connections going from high to low levels. Accessing the relevant low-level representations requires a backward search during which informative input populations of neurons in the low level are allocated. Hence, subsequent learning and its specificity reflect the resolution of lower levels. RHT thus proposes that initial performance is limited by the high-level resolution whereas post-training performance is limited by the resolution at low levels. Since high-level representations of different individuals differ due to their prior experience, their initial learning patterns may differ. Several imaging studies are in line with this interpretation, finding that initial performance is correlated with average (BOLD) responses at higher-level areas whereas subsequent performance is more correlated with activity at lower-level areas. RHT proposes that modifications at low levels will occur only when the backward search (from high to low levels of processing) is successful. Such success requires that the backward search will "know" which neurons in the lower level are informative. This "knowledge" is gained by training repeatedly on a limited set of stimuli, such that the same lower-level neuronal populations are informative during several trials. Recent studies found that mixing a broad range of stimuli may also yield effective learning if these stimuli are clearly perceived as different, or are explicitly tagged as different. These findings further support the requirement for top-down guidance in order to obtain effective learning.

=== Enrichment versus differentiation ===
In some complex perceptual tasks, all humans are experts. We are all very sophisticated, but not infallible at scene identification, face identification and speech perception. Traditional explanations attribute this expertise to some holistic, somewhat specialized, mechanisms. Perhaps such quick identifications are achieved by more specific and complex perceptual detectors which gradually "chunk" (i.e., unitize) features that tend to concur, making it easier to pull a whole set of information. Whether any concurrence of features can gradually be chunked with practice or chunking can only be obtained with some pre-disposition (e.g. faces, phonological categories) is an open question. Current findings suggest that such expertise is correlated with a significant increase in the cortical volume involved in these processes. Thus, we all have somewhat specialized face areas, which may reveal an innate property, but we also develop somewhat specialized areas for written words as opposed to single letters or strings of letter-like symbols. Moreover, special experts in a given domain have larger cortical areas involved in that domain. Thus, expert musicians have larger auditory areas. These observations are in line with traditional theories of enrichment proposing that improved performance involves an increase in cortical representation. For this expertise, basic categorical identification may be based on enriched and detailed representations, located to some extent in specialized brain areas. Physiological evidence suggests that training for refined discrimination along basic dimensions (e.g. frequency in the auditory modality) also increases the representation of the trained parameters, though in these cases the increase may mainly involve lower-level sensory areas.

=== Selective reweighing ===
In 2005, Petrov, Dosher and Lu pointed out that perceptual learning may be explained in terms of the selection of which analyzers best perform the classification, even in simple discrimination tasks. They explain that the some part of the neural system responsible for particular decisions have specificity, while low-level perceptual units do not. In their model, encodings at the lowest level do not change. Rather, changes that occur in perceptual learning arise from changes in higher-level, abstract representations of the relevant stimuli. Because specificity can come from differentially selecting information, this "selective reweighting theory" allows for learning of complex, abstract representation. This corresponds to Gibson's earlier account of perceptual learning as selection and learning of distinguishing features. Selection may be the unifying principles of perceptual learning at all levels.

== The impact of training protocol and the dynamics of learning ==
Ivan Pavlov discovered conditioning. He found that when a stimulus (e.g. sound) is immediately followed by food several times, the mere presentation of this stimulus would subsequently elicit saliva in a dog's mouth. He further found that when he used a differential protocol, by consistently presenting food after one stimulus while not presenting food after another stimulus, dogs were quickly conditioned to selectively salivate in response to the rewarded one. He then asked whether this protocol could be used to increase perceptual discrimination, by differentially rewarding two very similar stimuli (e.g. tones with similar frequency). However, he found that differential conditioning was not effective.

Pavlov's studies were followed by many training studies which found that an effective way to increase perceptual resolution is to begin with a large difference along the required dimension and gradually proceed to small differences along this dimension. This easy-to-difficult transfer was termed "transfer along a continuum".

These studies showed that the dynamics of learning depend on the training protocol, rather than on the total amount of practice. Moreover, it seems that the strategy implicitly chosen for learning is highly sensitive to the choice of the first few trials during which the system tries to identify the relevant cues.

=== Consolidation and sleep ===
Several studies asked whether learning takes place during practice sessions or in between, for example, during subsequent sleep. The dynamics of learning are hard to evaluate since the directly measured parameter is performance, which is affected by both learning, inducing improvement, and fatigue, which hampers performance. Current studies suggest that sleep contributes to improved and durable learning effects, by further strengthening connections in the absence of continued practice. Both slow-wave and REM (rapid eye movement) stages of sleep may contribute to this process, via not-yet-understood mechanisms.

=== Comparison and contrast ===
Practice with comparison and contrast of instances that belong to the same or different categories allow for the pick-up of the distinguishing features—features that are important for the classification task—and the filter of the irrelevant features.

=== Task difficulty ===
Learning easy examples first may lead to better transfer and better learning of more difficult cases. By recording ERPs from human adults, Ding and Colleagues investigated the influence of task difficulty on the brain mechanisms of visual perceptual learning. Results showed that difficult task training affected earlier visual processing stage and broader visual cortical regions than easy task training.

=== Active classification and attention ===
Active classification effort and attention are often necessary to produce perceptual learning effects. However, in some cases, mere exposure to certain stimulus variations can produce improved discriminations.

=== Feedback ===
In many cases, perceptual learning does not require feedback (whether or not the classification is correct). Other studies suggest that block feedback (feedback only after a block of trials) produces more learning effects than no feedback at all.

=== Limits ===
Despite the marked perceptual learning demonstrated in different sensory systems and under varied training paradigms, it is clear that perceptual learning must face certain unsurpassable limits imposed by the physical characteristics of the sensory system. For instance, in tactile spatial acuity tasks, experiments suggest that the extent of learning is limited by fingertip surface area, which may constrain the underlying density of mechanoreceptors.

== Relations to other forms of learning ==
=== Declarative & procedural learning ===
In many domains of expertise in the real world, perceptual learning interacts with other forms of learning. Declarative knowledge tends to occur with perceptual learning. As we learn to distinguish between an array of wine flavors, we also develop a wide range of vocabularies to describe the intricacy of each flavor.

Similarly, perceptual learning also interacts flexibly with procedural knowledge. For example, the perceptual expertise of a baseball player at bat can detect early in the ball's flight whether the pitcher threw a curveball. However, the perceptual differentiation of the feel of swinging the bat in various ways may also have been involved in learning the motor commands that produce the required swing.

=== Implicit learning ===
Perceptual learning is often said to be implicit, such that learning occurs without awareness. It is not at all clear whether perceptual learning is always implicit. Changes in sensitivity that arise are often not conscious and do not involve conscious procedures, but perceptual information can be mapped onto various responses.

In complex perceptual learning tasks (e.g., sorting of newborn chicks by sex, playing chess), experts are often unable to explain what stimulus relationships they are using in classification. However, in less complex perceptual learning tasks, people can point out what information they're using to make classifications.

=== Category learning vs. perceptual learning ===
Perceptual learning is distinguished from category learning. Perceptual learning generally refers to the enhancement of detectability of a perceptual item or the discriminability between two or more items. In contrast, category learning involves labeling or categorizing an item into a particular group or category. However, in some cases, there is an overlap between perceptual learning and category learning. For instance, to discriminate between two items, a categorical difference between them may sometimes be utilized, in which case category learning, rather than perceptual learning, is thought to occur. Although perceptual learning and category learning are distinct forms of learning, they can interact. For example, category learning that groups multiple orientations into different categories can lead perceptual learning of one orientation to transfer across other orientations within the same category as the trained orientation. This is termed "category-induced perceptual learning".

=== Neuropsychology of perceptual category learning ===
Multiple different category learning systems may mediate the learning of different category structures. "Two systems that have received support are a frontal-based explicit system that uses logical reasoning, depends on working memory and executive attention, and is mediated primarily by the anterior cingulate, the prefrontal cortex and the associative striatum, including the head of the caudate. The second is a basal ganglia-mediated implicit system that uses procedural learning, requires a dopamine reward signal and is mediated primarily by the sensorimotor striatum" The studies showed that there was significant involvement of the striatum and less involvement of the medial temporal lobes in category learning. In people who have striatal damage, the need to ignore irrelevant information is more predictive of a rule-based category learning deficit. Whereas, the complexity of the rule is predictive of an information integration category learning deficit.

== Applications ==
=== Improving perceptual skills ===
An important potential application of perceptual learning is the acquisition of skill for practical purposes. Thus it is important to understand whether training for increased resolution in lab conditions induces a general upgrade which transfers to other environmental contexts, or results from mechanisms which are context specific. Improving complex skills is typically gained by training under complex simulation conditions rather than one component at a time. Recent lab-based training protocols with complex action computer games have shown that such practice indeed modifies visual skills in a general way, which transfers to new visual contexts. In 2010, Achtman, Green, and Bavelier reviewed the research on video games to train visual skills. They cite a previous review by Green & Bavelier (2006) on using video games to enhance perceptual and cognitive abilities. A variety of skills were upgraded in video game players, including "improved hand-eye coordination, increased processing in the periphery, enhanced mental rotation skills, greater divided attention abilities, and faster reaction times, to name a few". An important characteristic is the functional increase in the size of the effective visual field (within which viewers can identify objects), which is trained in action games and transfers to new settings. Whether learning of simple discriminations, which are trained in separation, transfers to new stimulus contexts (e.g. complex stimulus conditions) is still an open question.

Like experimental procedures, other attempts to apply perceptual learning methods to basic and complex skills use training situations in which the learner receives many short classification trials. Tallal, Merzenich and their colleagues have successfully adapted auditory discrimination paradigms to address speech and language difficulties. They reported improvements in language learning-impaired children using specially enhanced and extended speech signals. The results applied not only to auditory discrimination performance but speech and language comprehension as well.

=== Technologies for perceptual learning ===
In educational domains, recent efforts by Philip Kellman and colleagues showed that perceptual learning can be systematically produced and accelerated using specific, computer-based technology. Their approach to perceptual learning methods take the form of perceptual learning modules (PLMs): sets of short, interactive trials that develop, in a particular domain, learners' pattern recognition, classification abilities, and their abilities to map across multiple representations. As a result of practice with mapping across transformations (e.g., algebra, fractions) and across multiple representations (e.g., graphs, equations, and word problems), students show dramatic gains in their structure recognition in fraction learning and algebra. They also demonstrated that when students practice classifying algebraic transformations using PLMs, the results show remarkable improvements in fluency at algebra problem solving. These results suggests that perceptual learning can offer a needed complement to conceptual and procedural instructions in the classroom.

Similar results have also been replicated in other domains with PLMs, including anatomic recognition in medical and surgical training, reading instrumental flight displays, and apprehending molecular structures in chemistry.

== See also ==
- Adaptation
- Categorical perception
- Category learning
- Cognitive development
- Educational psychology
- Eureka effect
- Implicit learning
- Neuroplasticity
- Pattern recognition
