= Auditory moving-window =

Auditory moving window

The auditory moving-window is a psycholinguistic paradigm developed at Michigan State University by Fernanda Ferreira and colleagues. Ferreira and colleagues built the paradigm in order to address the scarcity of (fluent) spoken-language comprehension literature versus the robustness of that for visual-word processing. Auditory moving-window can be used to assess indirectly the processing load of a sentence: this processing load is assessed by an analogue of reaction time within the paradigm (discussed below). Reaction times within the paradigm are sensitive to at least word frequency and garden path effects.

The paradigm has been used in the study of syntactic processing in the study of aphasic patients. One such study suggests that many aphasic patients retain their abilities to process syntactic structures on-line. Further, evidence suggests that Expressive aphasics have a degraded ability to process complex syntax on-line, whereas Receptive aphasics are impaired only after on-line comprehension concludes

== Application of the auditory moving-window ==
The auditory moving-window paradigm, because of its similarity to the eye tracking paradigm, has a broad range of applications. It is at least sensitive enough to detect frequency effects on comprehension: low frequency words had a greater IRT and DT than high frequency words, suggesting a relative difficulty of lexical access. Further, it is sensitive to garden path effects

== Technical details ==
Stimuli preparation

Because one of the aims of the auditory moving-window is to investigate fluent speech, the paradigm is several steps more complex than simple auditory word-by-word presentation:

- To begin, a speaker records an unbroken sample of speech.
- Following this, the researcher using the paradigm artificially segments the sample, using an audio-editing software such as Computerized Speech Laboratory.
  - The segment size is contingent on the target of the research. In Ferreira et al. (1996), segments follow phrasal boundaries. The practical limit seems to be clausal at the poorest resolution, verbal at the finest: the auditory moving-window is meant to capture "fluent" speech, which in natural production includes at least the paralinguistic information of prosody.
- After the speech sample has been segmented, the researcher may choose to regularize variables such as amplitude or sampling rate of the segments.
  - A completed sample may read out as the following, where "^" indicates a segment bound:
    - George ^ looked ^ for ^ a new ^ chest ^ for ^ his European ^ clothes.
- At the end of a sample, the researcher may elect to insert a single tone to indicate the end of the sample, as sentence-final prosody differs across sentence types and it may not be clear to the subject that the sample has in fact ended.

Stimuli presentation

The presentation of a prepared sample depends on what software is being used. What follows is an abstraction of the general strategy.

- The software loads a sample during the experiment.
- The participant in the study initiates the sample presentation by pressing a "pacing button": this introduces the first segment.
- Each subsequent button press initiates the next segment. The software may be programmed such that segments must conclude before the next is available.
  - The software monitors the time between button presses. This is the Inter-Response Time (IRT). The actual duration of the segment is subtracted from the IRT to yield the Difference Time (DT). This DT is the variable of interest.

Analytical logic

The auditory moving-window is roughly analogous to an eye tracking task presented in the auditory modality. The eye tracking variable of interest that is thought to be closest to the DT is that of fixation duration. They are held to be directly related: a greater DT is correspondent to a greater fixation duration. Several eye-tracking studies use fixation duration as an indirect measure of processing load: a greater fixation duration is correspondent to a greater processing load . The same applies to DTs.
