= Linguistic frequency =

Linguistic frequency is a vague phrase that can be used in reference to either:

- Word frequency, frequency of words in a given corpus
- Letter frequency, the frequency of letters of a given language
