= Prediction in language comprehension =

Phenomenon in psycholinguistics

Linguistic prediction is a phenomenon in psycholinguistics occurring whenever information about a word or other linguistic unit is activated before that unit is actually encountered. Evidence from eyetracking, event-related potentials, and other experimental methods indicates that in addition to integrating each subsequent word into the context formed by previously encountered words, language users may, under certain conditions, try to predict upcoming words. In particular, prediction seems to occur regularly when the context of a sentence greatly limits the possible words that have not yet been revealed. For instance, a person listening to a sentence like, "In the summer it is hot, and in the winter it is..." would be highly likely to predict the sentence completion "cold" in advance of actually hearing it. A form of prediction is also thought to occur in some types of lexical priming, a phenomenon whereby a word becomes easier to process if it is preceded by a related word. Linguistic prediction is an active area of research in psycholinguistics and cognitive neuroscience.

== Evidence from eyetracking ==
=== Visual world paradigms ===
In the eyetracking visual world paradigm, experimental subjects listen to a sentence while staring at an array of pictures on a computer monitor. Their eye movements are recorded, allowing the experimenter to understand how language influences eye movements toward pictures related to the content of the sentence. Experiments of this type have shown that while listening to the verb in a sentence, comprehenders anticipatorily move their eyes to the picture of the verb's likely direct object (e.g. "cake" rather than "ball" while hearing, "The boy will eat..."). Subsequent investigations using the same experimental setup showed that the verb's subject can also determine which object comprehenders anticipate (e.g., comprehenders look at the merry-go-round rather than the motorcycle while hearing, "The little girl will ride..."). In short, comprehenders use the information in the sentence context to predict the meanings of upcoming words. In these experiments, comprehenders used the verb and its subject to activate information about the verb's direct object before hearing that word. However, another experiment has shown that in a language with more flexible word order (German), comprehenders can also use context to predict the sentence's subject.

=== Natural reading ===
Eyetracking technology has also been used to monitor readers' eye movements while they read text on a computer screen. Data from this kind of experiment has supported the hypothesis that readers use contextual information to predict upcoming words during natural reading. Specifically, readers fixate their eyes on a word for a shorter time when the word occurs in a moderately or highly constraining context, compared to the same word in an unconstrained context. This is true regardless of the word's frequency or length. Readers are also more likely to skip over a word in a highly constraining context only. Subsequent investigations of reading in the Chinese logographic script have shown that despite the large differences between the Chinese and English orthographies, readers exploit contextual information for prediction in similar ways, with the exception that Chinese readers were more likely to skip words in moderately constraining contexts.

Computational models of eye movements during reading, which model data related to word predictability, include Reichle and colleagues' E-Z Reader model and Engbert and colleagues' SWIFT model.

== Evidence from event-related potentials ==
=== M100 ===
The M100 discussed here is the magnetic equivalent of the visual N1 potential—an event-related potential linked to visual processing and attention. The M100 was also linked to prediction in language comprehension in a series of event-related magnetoencephalography (MEG) experiments. In these experiments, participants read words whose visual forms were either predictable or unpredictable based on prior linguistic context or based on a recently seen picture. The predictability of the word's visual form (but not the predictability of its meaning) affected the amplitude of the M100. There is ongoing controversy about whether this M100 effect is related to the early left anterior negativity (eLAN), an event-related potential response to words that is theorized to reflect the brain's assignment of local phrase structure.

=== P2 ===
The P2 component is generally thought to reflect higher-order perceptual processing and its modulation by attention. However, it has also been linked to prediction of visual word forms. The P2 response to words in highly constraining contexts is often larger than the P2 response to words in less constraining contexts. When experimental participants read words that are presented to the left or right of their visual fixation (stimulating the opposite hemisphere of the brain first), the larger P2 for words in highly constraining contexts is observed only for right visual field presentation (targeting left hemisphere). This is consistent with the PARLO hypothesis that linguistic prediction is mainly a function of the left hemisphere, discussed below.

=== N400 ===
The N400 is part of the normal ERP response to potentially meaningful stimuli, whose amplitude is inversely correlated with the predictability of a stimuli in a particular context. In sentence processing, the predictability of a word is established by two related factors: 'cloze probability' and 'sentential constraint'. Cloze probability reflects the expectancy of a target word given the context of the sentence, which is determined by the percentage of individuals who supply the word when completing a sentence whose final word is missing. Kutas and colleagues found that the N400 to sentences final words with cloze probability of 90% was smaller (i.e., more positive) than the N400 for words with cloze probability of 70%, which was then smaller for words with cloze probability of 30%. Closely related, sentential constraint reflects the degree to which the context of the sentence constrains the number of acceptable continuations. Whereas cloze probability is the percent of individuals who choose a particular word, constraint is the number of different words chosen by a representative sample of individuals. Although words that are not predicted elicit a larger N400, the N400 to unpredicted words that are semantically related to the predicted word elicit a smaller N400 than when the unpredicted words are semantically unrelated. When the sentence context is highly constraining, semantically related words receive further facilitation in that the N400 to semantically related words is smaller in high constraint sentences than in low constraint sentences. Evidence for the prediction of specific words comes from a study by DeLong et al. DeLong and colleagues took advantage of the use of different indefinite articles, 'A' and 'AN' for English words that begin with a consonant or vowel respectively. They found that when the most probable sentence completion began with a consonant, the N400 was larger for 'AN' than for 'A' and vice versa, suggesting that prediction occurs at both a semantic and lexical level during language processing. (The study never replicated. In the most recent multi-lab attempt (335 participants), no evidence for word form prediction was found (Niewland et al., 2018).

=== Late positivity ===
==== P300 ====
The P300, specifically the P3b is an ERP response to improbable stimuli and is sensitive to the subjective probability that a particular stimulus will occur. The P300 has been closely tied to context updating, which can be initiated by unexpected stimuli.

==== P600 ====
The P600 an ERP response to syntactic violations, as well as complex, but error free, language. A P600-like response is also observed for thematically implausible sentences: example, "For breakfast, the eggs would only EAT toast and jam". Both P600 responses are generally attributed to the process of revising or continuing the analysis of the sentence. The syntactic P600 has been compared to the P300 in that both responses are sensitive to similar manipulations; importantly, the probability of the stimulus. The similarity between the two responses may suggest that the P300 significantly contributes to the syntactic P600 response.

==== Post-N400 positivity ====
A late positivity is often observed subsequent to the N400. Recent meta-analysis of the ERP literature on language processing has identified two different Post-N400 Positivities. In comparing the Post-N400 Positivity (PNP) for congruent and incongruent sentence final words, a parietal PNP is observed for incongruent words. This parietal PNP is similar to the typical P600 response, suggesting continued or revised analysis. Within the congruent condition, when comparing high- and low-cloze probability sentence final words, a PNP response (if it is observed) is generally distributed across the front of the scalp. A recent study has shown that the frontal PNP may reflect processing an unexpected lexical item instead of an unexpected concept, suggesting that the frontal PNP reflects disconfirmed lexical predictions.

== Evidence from functional imaging ==
Functional magnetic resonance imaging (fMRI) is a neuroimaging technology that uses nuclear magnetic resonance to measure blood oxygenation levels in the brain and spinal cord. Because neural activity affects blood flow, the pattern of the hemodynamic response is thought to correspond closely to the pattern of neural activity. The fine spatial resolution afforded by fMRI allows cognitive neuroscientists to see in detail which areas of the brain are activated in relation to an experimental task. However, the hemodynamic response is much slower than the neural activity measured by EEG and MEG. This poor sensitivity to timing information makes fMRI a less useful technique than EEG or eyetracking for studying linguistic prediction. One exception is an fMRI test of the differences in neural activation between strategic and automatic semantic priming. When the time between the prime and the target word is short (around 150 milliseconds), priming is theorized to rely on automatic neural processes. However, at longer time intervals (approaching 1 second), it is thought that experimental subjects strategically predict related upcoming words and suppress unrelated words, leading to a processing penalty in the event that an unrelated word actually occurs. An fMRI test of this hypothesis showed that at longer intervals, the processing penalty for an incorrect prediction is related to heightened activity in the anterior cingulate gyrus and Broca's area.

== Theories of prediction ==
=== PARLO theory ===
The PARLO ("Production Affects Reception in Left Only") framework is a theory of the neural domains supporting language prediction. It is based on evidence that shows that the left and right hemispheres differentially contribute to language comprehension. Generally, the neural structures that support language production are predominantly in the left hemisphere for most individuals creating a hemispheric asymmetry, which results in differential language processing abilities of the two hemispheres. Because of its spatially close ties and integration with language production, left hemisphere language comprehension seems to be driven by expectancy and context in a top-down manner, whereas the right hemisphere seems to integrate information in a bottom-up manner. The PARLO framework suggests that both prediction and integration occur during language processing but rely on the distinct contributions of the two hemispheres of the brain.

=== Surprisal theory ===
The surprisal theory is a theory of sentence processing based on information theory. In the surprisal theory, the cost of processing a word is determined by its self-information, or how predictable the word is, given its context. A highly probable word carries a small amount of self-information and would therefore be processed easily, as measured by reduced reaction time, a smaller N400 response, or reduced fixation times in an eyetracking reading study. Empirical tests of this theory have shown a high degree of match between processing cost measures and the self-information values assigned to words.
