= John Morton (cognitive scientist) =

English cognitive scientist (born 1933)

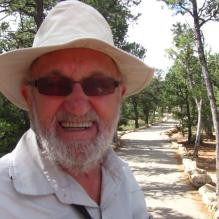
Dr John Morton 2011

John Morton, OBE, FRS (born 1933) is an emeritus professor at the Institute of Cognitive Neuroscience and was the director of the former Medical Research Council (MRC) Cognitive Development Unit (CDU) at University College London.

== Research ==
Morton's research focuses on event memory in adults and children; effects of memory on recall of events; types of memory system; memory pathologies; multiple personality disorder; cognitive models of memory; development of cognitive abilities; and causal models of developmental disorders, particularly autism and dyslexia.

One of his most important theories is the logogen model of word recognition. Morton has also worked, with Mark H. Johnson, on face recognition in infants.

== Organisational affiliations ==
Morton is a Fellow of the Royal Society.

== Selected publications ==
- Morton, J. (2017) Interidentity amnesia in dissociative identity disorder. Cognitive Neuropsychiatry. 22(4):315-330. doi: 0.1080/13546805.2017.1327848. Epub 2017 May 25.
- Michael Kopelman & John Morton (2015) - Amnesia in an actor: learning and re-learning of play passages despite severe autobiographical amnesia. Cortex, 67, 1–14. doi: 10.1016/j.cortex.2015.03.001. Epub 2015 Mar 18.
- Fava, L. & Morton, J. (2009) Causal modeling of panic disorder theories. Clinical Psychology Review, 29, 623–637.
- Krol, N., Morton, J. & De Bruyn, E. (2004). Theories of conduct disorder: a Causal Modelling analysis. Journal of Child Psychology and Psychiatry, 45, 727-742.
- Morton, J., & Frith, U. (1995). Causal Modelling: A Structural Approach to Developmental Psychopathology. In: Cicchetti, D. & Cohen, D.J. (Eds.), Manual of Developmental Psychopathology.Volume 1. New York:Wiley, 357–390.
- Ibbotson, N. & Morton, J. (1981). Rhythm and dominance. Cognition, 9, 125‑138.
- Morton, J. (1976). On recursive reference. Cognition, 4, 309.
- Garner, W.R. & Morton, J. (1969). Perceptual independence: Definitions, models and experimental paradigms. Psychological Bulletin, 72, 233‑259.
- Morton, J. (1968). Considerations of grammar and computation in language behaviour. In: Catford, J.C. (Ed). Studies in Language and Language Behaviour, CRLLB Progress Report No. VI, University of Michigan, 499‑545.
- For a full list of Morton's publications please see https://johnmorton.co.uk/professional-life/bibliography-2/.

== Honours and awards ==
- 1988 British Psychological Society President's Award.
- 1990 Member, Academiae Europaeae
- 1997 Honorary Fellow, British Psychological Society
- 1998 OBE
- 2000 Honorary Fellow, Institute of Cognitive Neuroscience
- 2001 Honorary Member, Experimental Psychology Society
- 2001 Neuronal Plasticity Prize of /La Fondation Ipsen
