= Fernanda Ferreira (psychologist) =

Cognitive psychologist

- Occupation: Professor of Psychology
- Spouse: John Henderson

Academic background
- Education: University of Manitoba; University of Massachusetts, Amherst

Academic work
- Institutions: University of California, Davis

Maria Fernanda Ferreira (born 22 September 1960) is a cognitive psychologist known for empirical investigations in psycholinguistics and language processing. She is professor of Psychology at University of California, Davis.

In 1995, Ferreira was awarded the Distinguished Scientific Award for Early Career Contribution to Psychology for cognition and human learning by the American Psychological Association. She is a fellow of the Association for Psychological Science, the Cognitive Science Society, and the Royal Society of Edinburgh (FRSE).

== Biography ==
Ferreira received her BA (Honours) in Psychology from the University of Manitoba in 1982. She completed postgraduate work at the University of Massachusetts, Amherst, obtaining degrees in Linguistics (MA 1986) and Psychology (MS 1985, PhD 1988). At U Mass Amherst, she worked under the supervision of Charles (Chuck) Clifton, Jr, investigating relationships between syntactic processing and phonology. Her dissertation, "Planning and Timing in Sentence Production: The Syntax-to-Phonology Conversion," provided evidence that phonological structures and representations, rather than syntactic structures, impact the timing of sentence-level speech.

Ferreira was previously an editor of Collabra: Psychology, an open-access psychology journal published by the University of California Press, and is currently a co-editor-in-chief of Glossa Psycholinguistics.

She is married to John Henderson, a collaborator and fellow professor at the University of California, Davis. Her brother, Victor Ferreira, is also a psycholinguist, and a professor at the University of California, San Diego.

== Research ==
Ferreira's research investigates the processes allowing for efficient comprehension and production of speech. One of these is the Good Enough theory of sentence processing, which posits that listeners, when processing linguistic input, engage in satisficing rather than constructing detailed representations. That is, the language processing system develops partial or superficial representations, which are "good enough" for the task they are meant to perform.

Further, these representations, which may be inaccurate when dealing with difficult input (e.g. garden path sentences), may persist after syntactic reanalysis. Ferreira's work on comprehension errors in adults reading passive sentences further supports the Good Enough model. This model of syntactic representation challenged the theories that held that sentence processing mechanisms generated fully complete and accurate representations.

One of Ferreira's methodological contributions is the auditory moving-window technique, which was used to assess influences of prosody, lexical frequency, and syntactic complexity in spoken-language comprehension.
