= Missing letter effect =

Cognitive phenomenon in reading

In cognitive psychology, the missing letter effect refers to the finding that, when people are asked to consciously detect target letters while reading text, they miss more letters in frequent function words (e.g. the letter "h" in "the") than in less frequent, content words. Understanding how, why and where this effect arises becomes useful in explaining the range of cognitive processes that are associated with reading text. The missing letter effect has also been referred to as the reverse word superiority effect, since it describes a phenomenon where letters in more frequent words fail to be identified, instead of letter identification benefitting from increased word frequency.

The method in which researchers utilise to measure this effect is termed a letter detection task. This involves a paper-and-pencil procedure, where readers are asked to circle a target letter, such as "t" every time they come across it while reading a prose passage or text. Researchers measure the number of letter detection errors, or missed circled target letters, in the texts. The missing letter effect is more likely to appear when reading words that are part of a normal sequence, than when words are embedded in a mixed-up sequence (e.g. readers asked to read backwards).

Despite the missing letter effect being a common phenomenon, there are different factors that have influence on the magnitude of this effect. Age (development), language proficiency and the position of target letters in words are some of these factors.

== Function vs content words ==
When testing for the missing letter effect, prose passages are used which incorporate a mix of common function words and rare content words.

Common function words are words that are used and seen very frequently and regularly in every day texts. These words are connector words for content words and consist of pronouns, articles, prepositions, conjunctions, and auxiliary verbs. Common examples of function words include “the”, “and”, “on”, “of” and “for” and majority of these words are short in length, consisting of usually around 1-4 letters. Because of their frequency and commonness, these words are seldom paid attention to or consciously observed.

Content words usually consist of nouns and regular verbs and are more rare than frequent function words. These word types are usually given and paid more attention to. The word “ant” is an example of a rare content word in comparison to a structurally similar looking frequent function word like “and”.

== Letter detection tasks ==
An example of a simple letter detection task

Letter detection tasks are ones that are set up and used to prove and measure the missing letter effect. Participants of this task are given prose passages or continuous texts to read and are told to circle every occurrence of a target letter. The missing letter effect is determined when target letters are missed or not circled, and these omissions or letter detection errors occur more when reading frequent function words than in rare content words. Saint-Aubin and Poirier reported from their experiment that there are higher accounts of letter detection omissions of the same word when it the word is presented as a definite article than when the word is a pronoun.

== Hypotheses ==
=== Early ===
Two primary hypotheses tried to explain the missing letter effect: Healy (1994) emphasized identification processes playing a crucial role, almost entirely focusing on word frequency. This hypothesis is primarily referred to as the unitization model and relates to familiar visual configuration. In this model, once readers have finished processing the text at a higher level (units like words), they move on and continue reading a different section of text, which interferes with the completion of processing of lower-level units (like letters). Common words are processed and “read in terms of units larger than the letter (e.g. syllables or whole words) whereas rare words tend to be read in smaller units (e.g. letters)”. The result is more letter detection errors occurring from insufficient processing of the lower-level units.

The processing time hypothesis also proposed by Healy, provides an explanation for the missing letter effect. The amount of time readers or participants of letter detection tasks take to process a word, dictates the occurrence of letter detection errors and the missing letter effect. The increase of processing time denotes the decrease of letter detection errors and the decrease of processing time follows as a result of an increase in word familiarity (or word frequency). The missing letter effect occurs due to faster processing of common function words at the higher level than rare content words, a result of “the higher familiarity of their visual patterns”.

Koriat & Greenberg (1994) give another explanation for the missing letter effect, viewing the structural role of the word within a sentence (i.e. function words vs. content words) to be crucial. This is termed the "alternative structural hypothesis". Within this hypothesis, rather than putting focus on familiarity as a determinant of this effect, it is “the word’s role in syntactic structure of a sentence” which encompasses common function words “receding into the background…to allow more meaningful content words to be brought into the foreground”. In this sense, the structural organization of texts overrules the perceptional organization (like the unitization model) in the occurrence of the missing letter effect. In the early stages of processing a text, its structural frame is speculatively formulated by the readers, constructed from a fast but insufficient processing of function words and punctuation. The missing letter effect unfolds as it is more difficult to detect target letters within function words as they are “pushed into the background” following structural analysis than it is to detect letters in content words which “stand in the foreground” and uncover the meaning of the text.

Both accounts were thoroughly investigated, but neither could completely explain the effect.

=== Contemporary ===
A new model called the guidance-organization (GO) model was recently proposed to potentially explain the missing letter effect. It is a combination of the two models proposed by Healy, Koriat, and Greenberg and illuminates the idea that word frequency and function together influence the rate of letter detection errors and omissions. Both the unitization and structural processes occur, but not concurrently. During reading, unitization processing takes place before structural processing and assists “lexical identification”, particularly of common function words which establish the basis of the phrase or sentence's structural organisation. The organisation of sentence structure proceeds to “guide attention” to the higher-level units and less frequent content words to understanding meaning. As Greenberg et al. explain: "The time spent processing high-frequency function words at the whole-word level is relatively short, thereby enabling the fast and early use of these words to build a tentative structural frame." In short, the GO model “is an account of how readers coordinate text elements to achieve on-line integration” and analysis of meaning of the text. Although this hypothesis models the missing letter effect, its limitation is that it is difficult to relate to models of reading.

Klein and Saint-Aubin proposed the attentional-disengagement model similarly includes aspects of the two earlier models but emphasizes the role of attention in reading and comprehension. In this model, letter detection errors increase, and the magnitude of the missing letter effect increases when there is a rapid attentional disengagement from a word in which a target letter is embedded. Saint-Aubin et al. propose that the likelihood of identifying a target letter within a word and/or text is contingent upon how much information about the possible presence of the target letter is available at that time. The timing of attentional disengagement from a “target-containing” word, essentially produces the missing letter effect where attention disengages faster from functional words than content words.

== Influential Factors ==
=== Age (Development) ===
Developmental change, grade level and generally reading skills increase with age, and all of these factors have some influence on the missing letter effect. The number of letter detection errors and size of the missing letter effect increases with age. When testing primary and elementary school children from grades one to four, the missing letter effect is higher for children who have better reading skills, where they tend to make more letter detection errors on function words than in rare content words. When testing primary school children (second graders) with college students the same effect is found where the older students miss target letters in function words more frequently than younger students do. When comparing adults and second graders, the missing letter effect gets larger with age but only when observing differences in letter detection errors in function words, not in word frequency.

Researchers Greenberg, Koriat and Vellutino give reasoning for these findings and write that the “missing letter effect arises very early in reading, by the first or second grade, and that its magnitude increases with grade level”. As reading skills and ability improve through developmental changes, younger readers gain a greater ability to process and understand texts and their structure. Because the configuration of texts and words influence the missing letter effect and letter detection errors, younger readers who have not yet developed enough to be conscious of text structure, are not affected as greatly as older readers by structural function words when analysing passages.

The conclusions that the magnitude of the missing letter effect increases with age, development and grade level are consistent with both the GO model and the AD model. The hypotheses assume and depict that more developed, good readers, whom of which are generally older, display more responsiveness to word frequency, in that they omit more target letters to more frequent words than younger, less developed poor readers. The missing letter effect is also incidental of word function, more so for older, more developed and better readers as they are better at “using information about the probable location of function words in a sentence”.

=== Language Proficiency ===
The missing letter effect is influenced by the proficiency of language when proficiency differs across two or more languages for one person. An experiment by Bovee and Raney recruited people who speak English proficiently and have a low proficiency level in Spanish to take part in a letter detection task with comprehension questions to follow. Results show that more letter detection errors are made when the readers read passages in their proficient language compared to when the passages are written in the language they have a low proficiency level in. Both function words and content words are presented in the texts and more letter omissions occur in function words than they do in content words when people read in their proficient language. When people read texts in their less proficient language, they omit more target letters in content words than they do in function words.

Both the GO and AD models are effective in explaining and predicting how the missing letter effect is greater for readers reading in their proficient language. Word familiarity and a greater knowledge and understanding of word frequency for function words and their structural functions, allows readers (who read text in their first language) to process words in a “top-down” approach, and increases target letter omissions. For readers reading in their less proficient language, their word familiarity and knowledge of word frequency and function is much more limited. Because of this, readers process text more sufficiently and pay more attention to individual words and “letter by letter word identification”, which results in less omissions of target letters, and a smaller sized missing letter effect.

=== Letter position in words ===
The position of letters in words and the position of suffix morphemes have an influence on word identification, letter detection, and the missing letter effect in texts. The letters at the start and end of words, or the first and last letter of a word, contribute to how people read and recognize words. When readers take part in the letter detection task and are given a connected text to read, there are less letter detection errors of a target letter (for example ‘t’) when it is situated as the initial letter of a word (e.g. tree) compared to when it is embedded into words (e.g. path). Drewnowski and Healy account for this where the initial letter of a word is “more separable from the rest of the word” and is “easier to detect because it can be processed individually”. When letters are transposed in words within a text, the last letter of these words is important in assisting target letter detection. The pace of reading is reduced when letters are transposed in words which allows for more comprehensive processing and provides a reason for why the last letter of a word can be identified more easily.

Drewnowski and Healy's (1980) experiments exhibit additional findings of significantly less letter detection errors when target letters embedded in a letter sequence are then embedded into other words than when the letter sequence appears as a “separate function word”. For example, more letter detection errors of the target letter ‘t’ are made when the function word “the” is embedded into the content word “thesis” rather than when “the” appears on its own in a text.

== See also ==
- Word superiority effect – Better recognition of letters if in words
- Visual perception – Ability to interpret the surrounding environment using light in the visible spectrum
- Alice F. Healy – American psychologist and academic
- Cognitive Psychology – Subdiscipline of psychology
- Reading – Taking in the meaning of letters or symbols
- Rapid automatized naming
- Shallow reading – Superficial information acquisition method
