= Byki, Kursk Oblast =

Rural locality in Kursk Oblast, Russia

Byki Быки
- Selo
- Interactive map of Byki
- Location of Byki Byki (Kursk Oblast)
- Coordinates: 51°39′57″N 35°30′05″E
- Country: Russia
- Federal subject: Kursk Oblast
- Administrative district: Kurchatovsky District
- SelsovietSelsoviet: Chaplinsky

Population (2010 Census)
  - Total: 274
  - Estimate (2010): 274 (0%)

Municipal status
  - Municipal district: Kurchatovsky Municipal District
  - Rural settlement: Chaplinsky Selsoviet Rural Settlement
- Time zone: UTC+3 (MSK)
- Postal code: 307241
- Dialing code: +7 47131
- OKTMO ID: 38621449106

Byki (Russian: Быки) is a rural locality (a selo) in Chaplinsky Selsoviet Rural Settlement, Kurchatovsky District, Kursk Oblast, Russia. Population: 274 (2010 census); 396 (2002 census);

== Geography ==
The selo is on the Seym River, 48 km south-west of Kursk, 10.5 km west of the district center – the town Kurchatov, 6.5 km from the selsoviet center – Chapli.

Climate

Byki has a warm-summer humid continental climate (Dfb in the Köppen climate classification).

Climate data for Byki
Month	Jan	Feb	Mar	Apr	May	Jun	Jul	Aug	Sep	Oct	Nov	Dec	Year
Mean daily maximum °C (°F)	−4 (25)	−3 (27)	3 (37)	13.1 (55.6)	19.4 (66.9)	22.7 (72.9)	25.2 (77.4)	24.5 (76.1)	18.2 (64.8)	10.6 (51.1)	3.5 (38.3)	−1.1 (30.0)	11.0 (51.8)
Daily mean °C (°F)	−6 (21)	−5.5 (22.1)	−0.6 (30.9)	8.3 (46.9)	14.8 (58.6)	18.4 (65.1)	20.9 (69.6)	20 (68)	14 (57)	7.3 (45.1)	1.3 (34.3)	−3 (27)	7.5 (45.5)
Mean daily minimum °C (°F)	−8.4 (16.9)	−8.5 (16.7)	−4.7 (23.5)	2.9 (37.2)	9.2 (48.6)	13.1 (55.6)	15.9 (60.6)	14.9 (58.8)	9.8 (49.6)	4 (39)	−1 (30)	−5.2 (22.6)	3.5 (38.3)
Average precipitation mm (inches)	51 (2.0)	45 (1.8)	48 (1.9)	51 (2.0)	63 (2.5)	71 (2.8)	76 (3.0)	55 (2.2)	58 (2.3)	58 (2.3)	48 (1.9)	49 (1.9)	673 (26.6)
Source: https://en.climate-data.org/asia/russian-federation/kursk-oblast/быки-656076/

== Transport ==
Byki is located 4.5 km from the road of regional importance 38K-017 (Kursk – Lgov – Rylsk – border with Ukraine), on the road of intermunicipal significance 38H-349 (38K-017 – Byki), 5 km from the nearest railway station Blokhino (railway line Lgov I — Kursk).

The rural locality is situated 55 km from Kursk Vostochny Airport, 137 km from Belgorod International Airport and 258 km from Voronezh Peter the Great Airport.
