= Transparent Language Online =

American language learning software company

Transparent Language, Inc.
- Operating system: Microsoft Windows, Mac OS X, iOS
- Platform: Mac OS X v10.4.4 or later Windows XP; Windows Vista; Windows 7
- Available in: English, Spanish, Arabic, Portuguese
- Type: Educational (foreign language instruction)
- License: Proprietary
- Website: www.transparent.com

Transparent Language Inc. is a language learning software company based in Nashua, New Hampshire. Since 1991, Transparent Language has been offering its products to individual consumers. They have expanded over the past decade into services for educational institutions and government agencies, ranging from MIT to the Department of Defense.

== Methodology ==
Transparent Language's products primarily teach vocabulary, since the company holds the position that vocabulary is more fundamental to language learning than grammar. To teach vocabulary through repeated exposure, Transparent Language software tracks learning and employs an algorithm to repeat vocabulary at the appropriate intervals to ensure memorization, a practice known as spaced repetition. A vocabulary item must be repeated several times to be considered learned, and after a specific period of time, these learned items must be refreshed in order to be kept in memory.

== Products and services ==
For the government sector, Transparent Language develops the CL-150 Platform, which is licensed by a number of United States Government organizations, including Defense Language Institute and Special Operations Forces. The CL-150 is a growing suite of applications and content for the acquisition and sustainment of language for specialized government purposes. CL-150 includes Rapid Rote, which is a military version of Before You Know It (BYKI). It uses a web portal to synchronize learning materials and user progress on desktop and handheld devic. Rapid Rote can be used for rapid learning in classrooms, creating flash cards and sentence completions from phrases and sentences chosen by the student.

== 7000 Languages Project ==
Transparent Language originally launched the Heritage and Endangered Language Program (HELP) to give back to the language community.

Through this program, Transparent Language offers free support to organizations to create software programs for less commonly taught or endangered languages. The company has partnered Grassroots Indigenous Multimedia to preserve the Native American language Ojibwe, and has worked with BASAbali to create a course for Balinese, a threatened language spoken on the Indonesian island of Bali. The program equips these partners with tools to continue teaching their language of interest, while also exposing the language to the entire Transparent Language user base. The CEO, Michael Quinlan, explains Transparent Language's commitment to this initiative in this way: "We live in an age of global interaction. No language is so small that no one needs to learn it. If we could, we would provide learning material for all 7,000 languages in the world."

In April 2013, Transparent Language announced the launch of the 7000 Languages Project. The initiative replaces and expands upon the former Heritage and Endangered Language Program in an effort to provide the company's language learning technology and platforms to under-resourced languages, in conjunction with NCOLCTL.

In 2017, the 7000 Languages Project became an independent 501(c)(3) non-profit organization, still committed to the goal of preserving and promoting endangered and Indigenous languages. Transparent Language continues to donate its technology in support of the organization's language courses.

== See also ==
- Byki (software)
- Language acquisition
