= Blagodatnoye, Kurchatovsky District, Kursk Oblast =

Rural locality in Kursk Oblast, Russia

Blagodatnoye Благодатное
- Village
- Interactive map of Blagodatnoye
- Location of Blagodatnoye Blagodatnoye (Kursk Oblast)
- Coordinates: 51°34′26″N 35°32′45″E
- Country: Russia
- Federal subject: Kursk Oblast
- Administrative district: Kurchatovsky District
- SelsovietSelsoviet: Chaplinsky

Population (2010 Census)
  - Total: 128
  - Estimate (2010): 128 (0%)

Municipal status
  - Municipal district: Kurchatovsky Municipal District
  - Rural settlement: Chaplinsky Selsoviet Rural Settlement
- Time zone: UTC+3 (MSK)
- Postal code: 307227
- Dialing code: +7 47131
- OKTMO ID: 38621449111

Blagodatnoye (Russian: Благодатное) is a rural locality (a village) in Chaplinsky Selsoviet Rural Settlement, Kurchatovsky District, Kursk Oblast, Russia. Population: 128 (2010 census); 150 (2002 census);

== Geography ==
The village is in the Reut River basin, 48 km south-west of Kursk, 12 km south-west of the district center – the town Kurchatov, 4 km from the selsoviet center – Chapli.

Climate

Blagodatnoye has a warm-summer humid continental climate (Dfb in the Köppen climate classification).

== Transport ==
Blagodatnoye is located 6 km from the road of regional importance 38K-017 (Kursk – Lgov – Rylsk – border with Ukraine), on the road of intermunicipal significance 38H-376 (38K-017 – Chapli – Blagodatnoye), 6 km from the nearest railway station Blokhino (railway line Lgov I — Kursk).

The rural locality is situated 54 km from Kursk Vostochny Airport, 126 km from Belgorod International Airport and 256 km from Voronezh Peter the Great Airport.
