= Philip Kellman =

American psychologist

Philip Kellman is Distinguished Professor of Psychology and the current Cognitive Area Chair in the Department of Psychology at the University of California, Los Angeles. He is also Adjunct Professor of Surgery in the David Geffen UCLA School of Medicine, and the founder of Insight Learning Technology, Inc, a company that applies perceptual learning, adaptive learning technology, and principles from cognitive science research to improve education and training. His research interests involve perception and visual cognition, specifically visual perception of objects, shape, space, and motion, and perceptual development. He is also an expert in perceptual learning, adaptive learning, and their applications to skill acquisition and educational technology.

Kellman obtained his Bachelor of Science with high honors from Georgetown University in 1976. From there he earned his PhD from the University of Pennsylvania in 1980. His PhD advisor was Elizabeth Spelke. Upon graduation, he was a professor and Chair of the Division of Natural Sciences and Engineering at Swarthmore College before joining the UCLA faculty in 1993.

Kellman has received a number of national awards for research, including the William Chase Memorial Award from Carnegie-Mellon University, the Boyd R. McCandless Award from the American Psychological Association, and the Wolf Aviation Prize from the Alfred and Constance Wolf Foundation. He is a Fellow of the Association for Psychological Science, the Psychonomic Society, and the Society of Experimental Psychologists.

== Selected publications ==
=== Visual Perception of Objects, Contours, and Surfaces ===
==== Books ====
- Arterberry, M.E. & Kellman, P.J. Development of Perception in Infancy: The Cradle of Knowledge Revisited, Oxford University Press, 2016.
- Shipley, T.F. & Kellman, P. J. (Eds.). (2001). From Fragments to Objects: Segmentation and Grouping in Vision. Amsterdam: Elsevier Science Press. ISBN 0-444-50506-7
- Kellman, P.J. & Arterberry, M. (1998). The Cradle of Knowledge: Perceptual Development in Infancy. Cambridge, MA: MIT Press. ISBN 0-262-11232-9

==== Articles ====
- Baker, N., Lu, H., Erlikhman, G. & Kellman, P.J. (in press). Deep convolutional networks do not classify based on global object shape. PLoS: Computational Biology.
- Baker, N., Kellman, P.J., Erlikhman, G. & Lu, H. (2018). Deep convolutional networks do not perceive illusory contours. In T.T. Rogers, M. Rau, X. Zhu, & C. W. Kalish (Eds.), Proceedings of the 40th Annual Conference of the Cognitive Science Society (pp. ). Austin, TX: Cognitive Science Society
- Baker, Nicholas; Kellman, Philip J. (September 2018). "Abstract shape representation in human visual perception". Journal of Experimental Psychology: General. 147 (9): 1295–1308. doi:10.1037/xge0000409. PMID 29629783. S2CID 4717296.
- Palmer, E.M. & Kellman, P.J. (2017). The aperture capture illusion. In Shapiro, A., & Todorovic, D. (Eds.) The Oxford Compendium of Visual Illusions. Oxford University Press.
- Carrigan, S.B., Palmer, E.M. & Kellman, P.J. (2016). Differentiating global and local contour completion using a dot localization paradigm, Journal of Experimental Psychology: Human Perception and Performance. 2016 Aug 8. [Epub ahead of print]
- Erlikhman, Gennady; Kellman, Philip J. (28 June 2016). "From Flashes to Edges to Objects: Recovery of Local Edge Fragments Initiates Spatiotemporal Boundary Formation". Frontiers in Psychology. 7: 910. doi:10.3389/fpsyg.2016.00910. PMC 4923245. PMID 27445886.
- Erlikhman, Gennady; Kellman, Philip J. (September 2016). "Modeling spatiotemporal boundary formation". Vision Research. 126: 131–142. doi:10.1016/j.visres.2015.03.016. PMID 25872180.
- Erlikhman, Gennady; Xing, Yang Z.; Kellman, Philip J. (16 December 2014). "Non-rigid illusory contours and global shape transformations defined by spatiotemporal boundary formation". Frontiers in Human Neuroscience. 8: 978. doi:10.3389/fnhum.2014.00978. PMC 4267208. PMID 25566018.
- Ghose, Tandra; Liu, Janelle; Kellman, Philip J. (September 2014). "Recovering metric properties of objects through spatiotemporal interpolation". Vision Research. 102: 80–88. doi:10.1016/j.visres.2014.07.015. PMID 25111311.
- Kellman, P.J., Mnookin, J., Erlikhman, G., Garrigan, P., Ghose, T., Mettler, E., Charlton, D. & Dror, I.E. (2014). Forensic comparison and matching of fingerprints: Using quantitative image measures for estimating error rates through understanding and predicting difficulty. PLoS ONE, 9(5): e94617.
- Palmer, E. & Kellman, P.J. (2014). The aperture capture illusion: Misperceived forms in dynamic occlusion displays. Journal of Experimental Psychology: Human Perception and Performance. 40(2), 502-24.
- Erlikhman, G., Keane, B.P., Mettler, E., Horowitz, T.S., & Kellman, P.J. (2013). Automatic feature-based grouping during multiple object tracking. Journal of Experimental Psychology: Human Perception and Performance, 39(6), 1625-37.
- Kellman, P.J., Garrigan, P.B. & Erlikhman (2013). Challenges in understanding visual shape perception and representation: Bridging subsymbolic and symbolic coding. In S. J. Dickinson & Z. Pizlo (Eds.), Shape perception in human and computer vision: An interdisciplinary perspective. London: Springer, pp. 249–274.
- Keane, B.P., Lu, H., Papathomas, T.V., Silverstein, S.M., & Kellman, P.J. (2013). Reinterpreting behavioral receptive fields: Surface filling-in alters visually completed shape. PLoS ONE, 8(6), e62505.
- Keane, B.P., Kellman, P.J., Lu, H., & Papathomas, T.V., & Silverstein, S.M. (2012). Is interpolation cognitively encapsulated? Measuring the effects of belief on Kanizsa shape discrimination and illusory contour formation. Cognition, 123, 404–418.
- Garrigan, P.B. & Kellman, P.J. (2011). The role of constant curvature in 2D contour shape representations. Perception, 40(11): 1290-1308.
- Keane, B., Mettler, E., Tsoi, V., & Kellman, P. J. (2011). Contour interpolation automatically directs attention in multiple object tracking. Journal of Experimental Psychology: Human Perception & Performance.
- Kalar, D., Garrigan, P., Hilger, J., Wickens, T. & Kellman, P.J. (2010). A unified model for contour interpolation. Vision Research, 50(3), 284-299.
- Fantoni, C., Hilger, J., Gerbino, W. & Kellman, P. J. (2008). Surface interpolation and 3D relatability. Journal of Vision, Vol. 8, No. 7, Article 29, 1-19.
- Keane, B. P., Lu, H., & Kellman, P. J. (2007). Classification images reveal spatiotemporal interpolation in illusory figures. Vision Research, 47, 3460-3475.
- Kellman, P.J., Garrigan, P.B., Shipley, T.F. & Keane, B.P. (2007). Interpolation processes in object perception: A reply to Anderson. Psychological Review, 114(2): 488-502.
- Palmer, E. M., Kellman, P. J., & Shipley, T. F. (2006). A theory of dynamic occluded and illusory object perception. Journal of Experimental Psychology: General, 135, 513–541. (Selected for American Psychological Association Young Investigator Award – best paper published in JEP: General in 2006 by a young investigator (Evan Palmer).)
- Kellman, P.J., Garrigan, P., & Shipley, T. F. (2005). Object interpolation in three dimensions. Psychological Review, Vol. 112, No. 3, 586-609.
- Kellman, P.J., Garrigan, P., Yin, C., Shipley, T. & Machado, L. (2005). 3D interpolation in object perception: Evidence from an objective performance paradigm. Journal of Experimental Psychology: Human Perception & Performance, 31, 558-583.
- Guttman, S.E. & Kellman, P.J. (2004). Contour interpolation revealed by a dot localization paradigm. Vision Research, 44(15), 1799-1815.
- Guttman, S.E., Sekuler, A.B. & Kellman, P.J. (2003). Temporal variations in visual completion: A reflection of spatial limits? Journal of Experimental Psychology: Human Perception and Performance, 29, 1211-1227.
- Kellman, P.J. (2003). Perceptual processes that create objects from fragments. Proceedings of the 2003 IEEE International Joint Conference on Neural Networks.
- Shipley, T.F. & Kellman, P.J. (2003). Boundary completion in illusory contours: Interpolation or extrapolation? Perception, 32(8): 985-999.
- Kellman, P.J. (2003). Interpolation processes in the visual perception of objects. Neural Networks, 16, 915-923.
- Kellman, P.J. (2002). Vision - occlusion, illusory contours and 'filling in. In Encyclopedia of Cognitive Science, Oxford, UK: Nature Publishing Group.
- Kellman, P.J. (2001). Separating processes in object perception. Journal of Experimental Child Psychology, 78, 84-97.
- Yin, C., Kellman, P.J. & Shipley, T.F. (2000). Surface integration influences depth discrimination. Vision Research, 40(15), 1969-1978.

=== Perceptual and Adaptive Learning and their Applications ===
- Kellman, Philip J.; Krasne, Sally (9 August 2018). "Accelerating expertise: Perceptual and adaptive learning technology in medical learning". Medical Teacher. 40 (8): 797–802. doi:10.1080/0142159X.2018.1484897. PMC 6584026. PMID 30091650.
- Cui, L., Massey, C.M. & Kellman, P.J. (2018). Perceptual learning in correlation estimation: The role of learning category organization. In T.T. Rogers, M. Rau, X. Zhu, & C. W. Kalish (Eds.), Proceedings of the 40th Annual Conference of the Cognitive Science Society (pp. ). Austin, TX: Cognitive Science Society.
- Mettler, E., Massey, C.M., Garrigan, P. & Kellman, P.J. (2018). Enhancing adaptive learning through strategic scheduling of passive and active learning modes. In T.T. Rogers, M. Rau, X. Zhu, & C. W. Kalish (Eds.), Proceedings of the 40th Annual Conference of the Cognitive Science Society (pp. ). Austin, TX: Cognitive Science Society.
- Lerner, Neil; Gill, Michael; Kellman, Philip J.; Burke, Timothy; Older, Rachel M.; Scott-Parker, Bridie (March 2017). Development of a Novice Driver Training Module to Accelerate Driver Perceptual Expertise (PDF).
- Romito, B., Krasne, S., Kellman, P. & Dhillon, A. (2016). The impact of a perceptual and adaptive learning module on transoesophageal echocardiography interpretation by anaesthesiology residents. British Journal of Anaesthesia, 117 (4): 477-481.
- Massey, C.M., Kregor, J.D. & Kellman, P.J. (2016). Implementing mathematics learning software successfully in urban schools: Lessons for research and practice. American Educational Research Association (AERA) Online Paper Repository. http://www.aera.net/Publications/Online-Paper-Repository/AERA-Online-Paper-Repository/Owner/444889
- Bufford, C.A., Thai, K.P., Ho, J., Xiong, C., Hines, C. & Kellman, P.J. (2016). Perceptual learning of abstract musical patterns: Recognizing composer style. Proceedings of the 14th International Conference on Music Perception and Cognition.
- Mettler, E.M., Massey, C.M. & Kellman, P.J. (2016). A comparison of adaptive and fixed schedules of practice. Journal of Experimental Psychology: General, 145(7): 897-917.
- Unuma, H., Hasegawa, H., & Kellman, P.J. (2016). Perceptual learning facilitates precise mental representations of fractions. The Journal of Kawamura Gakuen Women's University. 27(1), 35-49.
- Rimoin, Lauren; Altieri, Lisa; Craft, Noah; Krasne, Sally; Kellman, Philip J. (March 2015). "Training pattern recognition of skin lesion morphology, configuration, and distribution". Journal of the American Academy of Dermatology. 72 (3): 489–495. doi:10.1016/j.jaad.2014.11.016. PMID 25592621.
- Bufford, C.A., Mettler, E., Geller, E.H. & Kellman, P.J. (2014). The psychophysics of algebra expertise: Mathematics perceptual learning interventions produce durable encoding changes. In P. Bello, M. Guarini, M. McShane & B. Scassellati, (Eds.), Proceedings of the 36th Annual Conference of the Cognitive Science Society. Austin, TX: Cognitive Science Society.
- Mettler, E.M. & Kellman, P.J. (2014). Adaptive response-time-based sequencing in perceptual learning. Vision Research, 99: 111-123.
- Kellman, P.J. & Massey, C. M. (2013). Perceptual learning, cognition, and expertise. In Ross, B. (Ed.). Psychology of Learning and Motivation, Volume 58, Academic Press, Elsevier, Inc.
- Krasne, S., Hillman, J.D., Kellman, P.J. & Drake, T.A. (2013). Applying perceptual and adaptive learning techniques to introductory histopathology for medical students. Journal of Pathology Informatics, 4: 34-41.
- Kellman, P. J. (2013). Adaptive and perceptual learning technologies in medical education and training. Military Medicine. 178, 10: 98-106.
- Massey, C.M., Kellman, P.J., Roth, Z. & Burke, T. (2011). Perceptual learning and adaptive learning technology: Developing new approaches to mathematics learning in the classroom. In Stein, N.L. (Ed.), Developmental and learning sciences go to school: Implications for education.
- Kellman, P.J., Massey, C.M & Son, J. (2010). Perceptual learning modules in mathematics: Enhancing students' pattern recognition, structure extraction, and fluency. Topics in Cognitive Science (Special Issue on Perceptual Learning), Vol. 2, Issue 2, 285-305.
- Kellman, P.J. & Garrigan, P.B. (2009). Perceptual learning and human expertise. Physics of Life Reviews, Vol. 6, No. 2, 53-84.
- Garrigan, P.B. & Kellman, P.J. (2008). Perceptual learning depends on perceptual constancy. Proceedings of the National Academy of Sciences (USA), Vol. 105, No. 6, 2248-2253.
- Kellman, P.J., Massey, C.M., Roth, Z., Burke, T., Zucker, J., Saw, A., Aguero, K.E. & Wise, J.A. (2008). Perceptual learning and the technology of expertise: Studies in fraction learning and algebra. Learning Technologies and Cognition: Special issue of Pragmatics & Cognition, 16:2 (2008), 356–405.
- Kellman, P.J. (2002). Perceptual learning. In R. Gallistel (Ed.), Stevens' handbook of experimental psychology, third edition, Vol. 3 (Learning, motivation and emotion), John Wiley & Sons.
