= Before You Know It =

Before You Know It may refer to:

- Before You Know It (software), a language acquisition software
- Before You Know It (2013 film), a 2013 documentary film
- Before You Know It (2019 film), a 2019 comedy film
- "Before You Know It" (song), a 2026 song by Kygo and Ava Max
