= Before You Know It (software) =

Language acquisition software package

Before You Know It (usually Byki) is language acquisition software package that listens to students and gives them detailed feedback on their pronunciation. There is also freeware for both Windows and Mac OS X which does not check pronunciation. Paid versions present continuous text, which can be used in various ways. The freeware version uses a flashcard software system. Courses were available in over 70 languages. Courses branded as Byki were produced by Transparent Language Online, which still produces courses under that and other names.

The system is based on declarative learning of a new language with English as the base language (except English is taught with Spanish as the base language), using the idea that the best way to approach a new language is through its vocabulary and pronunciation. The software has a virtual community of users who make the vocabulary database bigger.

This flashcard software program helps learning and remembering dozens of foreign languages vocabulary words and is available for both Windows and Macintosh. The language software has interactive vocabulary practice, progress tracker and sound files. It aims to be a personalized language-learning system that locks foreign language words and phrases into memory.

A distinctive feature in paid versions is their ability to record and graph the learner's pronunciation in detail, and compare it to the native speaker's pronunciation of the same words stored in the program. Paid versions teach 1,000-1,500 words per language.

The software was discontinued in 2017.

== See also ==
- Language education
- Language pedagogy
- List of language self-study programs
