= Word superiority effect =

Better recognition of letters if in words

In cognitive psychology, the word superiority effect (WSE) refers to the phenomenon that people have better recognition of letters presented within words as compared to isolated letters and to letters presented within nonword (orthographically illegal, unpronounceable letter array) strings. Studies have also found a WSE when letter identification within words is compared to letter identification within pseudowords (e.g. "WOSK") and pseudohomophones (e.g. "WERK").

The effect was first described by Cattell (1886), and important contributions came from Reicher (1969) and Wheeler (1970). Cattell first wrote, "I find it takes about twice as long to read...words which have no connexion as words which make sentences, and letters which have no connexions as letters which make words. When the words make sentences and the letters words, not only do the processes of seeing and naming overlap, but by one mental effort the subject can recognize a whole group of words or letters".

G. Reicher and D. Wheeler developed the basic experimental paradigm to study the WSE, referred to as the Reicher-Wheeler paradigm. In this paradigm, an observer is presented with a word or nonword string that is followed by a mask (brief stimulus to measure effects on behavior). The observer is then asked to name one of the letters from the cued position in that word or string making the test a two-alternative forced choice (2-AFC). For example, for the letter R in the word "card", an observer might be asked to choose between the letter R and T, and will usually be more efficient in doing so than if they are asked to make the same choice with the string of letters such as "cqrd". Each possible completion with the two possible letters in the word condition produce a word.

The WSE has since been exhaustively studied in the context of cognitive processes involved during reading. Large amounts of research have also been done to try to model the effect using connectionist networks.

== Experimental task ==
The WSE has traditionally been tested using a tachistoscope, as the durations of the letter string presentations need to be carefully controlled. Recently, stimulus presentation software has allowed much simpler manipulation of presentation durations using computers. The WSE has also been described without a tachistoscope.

A string of letters, usually four or five, is flashed for several milliseconds onto a screen. Readers are then asked to choose which of two letters had been in the flashed string. For example, if "WOSK" had been flashed, a reader might have to decide whether "K" or "H" had been in "WOSK". A WSE arises when subjects choose the correct letter more consistently when letter strings are real words rather than nonwords (e.g. "WKRG") or single letters.

== Hypotheses ==
The existence of a WSE generally implies that there is some type of access or encoding advantage that words have in the mind that pseudowords or single letters do not have. Various studies have proposed that the distinction is a result of pronounceability differences (nonwords are not pronounceable and therefore are not as easily remembered), frequency (real words are more frequently encountered and used), meaningfulness (real words have semantic value and therefore are better retained in memory), orthographic regularity (real words follow familiar spelling conventions and are therefore better retained in memory), or neighborhood density (real words tend to share more letters with other words than nonwords and therefore have more activation in the mind).

Other studies have proposed that the WSE is heavily affected or even induced by experimental factors, such as the type of masking used after the presentation of the word, or the duration of the masks.

== Models ==
The two popular models claiming to explain the WSE are the interactive activation model (IAM) and the dual-route coding model (DRC) Neither of these models takes attention into account; This is a relationship looked into through research on the WSE. Evidence shows that the WSE persists without an observer's conscious awareness of the word presented, which implies that attention is neither necessary for WSE nor involved in this phenomenon. However, attentional focus has been demonstrated to modulate the WSE which agrees with recent neurophysiological data explaining that attention, in fact, modulates early stages of word processing.

The activation-verification model (AVM) is another model that was developed to account for reaction time data from lexical decision and naming tasks. The basic operations explored in the AVM that are involved in word and letter recognition are encoding, verification, and decision. Both the IAM and the AVM share many basic assumptions such as the fact that stimulus input activates spatially-specific letter units, that activated letter units, modulate the activity of word units, and that letter and word recognition are frequently affected by top-down processes (e.g. Reading the phrase "A cow says..." a person would guess "moo" and in checking that the word begins with 'm' ignores the rest of the letters).

=== The WSE and an interactive-activation model ===
Rumelhart & McClelland's interactive-activation model.

The WSE has proven to be an important finding for word recognition models, and specifically is supported by Rumelhart and McClelland's interactive-activation model of word recognition. According to this model, when a reader is presented with a word, each letter in parallel will either stimulate or inhibit different feature detectors (e.g. a curved shape for "C", horizontal and vertical bars for "H", etc.). Those feature detectors will then stimulate or inhibit different letter detectors, which will finally stimulate or inhibit different word detectors. Some words can be activated through these stimulations. However, the fact that there is no meaning to the combination of letters can inhibit these words which were previously activated. Each activated connection would carry a different weight, and thus the word "WORK" in the example would be activated more than any other word (and therefore recognized by a reader).

According to this interactive-activation model, the WSE is explained as such: When the target letter is presented within a word, the feature detectors, letter detectors and word detectors will all be activated, adding weight to the final recognition of the stimulus. However, when only the letter is presented, only the letter detector level will be activated. Therefore, we may remember the presented stimulus word more clearly, and thereby be more accurate in identifying its component letters, as observed in the WSE.

=== Activation-verification model ===
The AVM deals with encoding, verification, and decision operations. Encoding is used to describe the early operations that lead to the unconscious activation of learned units in memory. After encoding, verification occurs. Verification often leads to the conscious recognition of a single lexical entry from the respondents. Verification is to be viewed as an independent, top-down analysis of stimulus that is guided by the stored, or previously learned, representation of a word. Real-time processing in verification can be mimicked by a computer simulation. Lastly, the factors affecting speed and accuracy of performance in a particular paradigm depend on whether decisions are based primarily on information from encoding or verification.

== Adverse word superiority effect ==
One of the findings of the Johnston and McClelland report was that the WSE does not occur inevitably whenever we compare a word and a nonword. Rather, it depends somewhat upon the strategies that readers use during a task. If readers paid more attention to the letter in a particular position, they would experience the adverse word superiority effect. This is because the reader would no longer have the benefit of having the word detector level activated with as much weight if they neglected to focus on the full word.

== See also ==
- Tachistoscope
- Missing letter effect
