= Chapli, Kursk Oblast =

Rural locality in Kursk Oblast, Russia

Chapli Чапли
- Selo
- Interactive map of Chapli
- Location of Chapli Chapli (Kursk Oblast)
- Coordinates: 51°36′33″N 35°31′57″E
- Country: Russia
- Federal subject: Kursk Oblast
- Administrative district: Kurchatovsky District
- SelsovietSelsoviet: Chaplinsky

Population (2010 Census)
  - Total: 530
  - Estimate (2010): 530 (0%)

Administrative status
  - Capital of: Chaplinsky Selsoviet

Municipal status
  - Municipal district: Kurchatovsky Municipal District
  - Rural settlement: Chaplinsky Selsoviet Rural Settlement
  - Capital of: Chaplinsky Selsoviet Rural Settlement
- Time zone: UTC+3 (MSK)
- Postal code: 307227
- Dialing code: +7 47131
- OKTMO ID: 38621449101

Chapli (Russian: Чапли) is a rural locality (a selo) and the administrative center of Chaplinsky Selsoviet Rural Settlement, Kurchatovsky District, Kursk Oblast, Russia. Population: 530 (2010 census); 658 (2002 census);

== Geography ==
The selo is on the Reut River, 48 km south-west of Kursk, 10 km south-west of the district center – the town Kurchatov.

Climate

Chapli has a warm-summer humid continental climate (Dfb in the Köppen climate classification).

Climate data for Chapli
Month	Jan	Feb	Mar	Apr	May	Jun	Jul	Aug	Sep	Oct	Nov	Dec	Year
Mean daily maximum °C (°F)	−3.9 (25.0)	−2.9 (26.8)	3.1 (37.6)	13.2 (55.8)	19.5 (67.1)	22.8 (73.0)	25.3 (77.5)	24.7 (76.5)	18.3 (64.9)	10.7 (51.3)	3.6 (38.5)	−1 (30)	11.1 (52.0)
Daily mean °C (°F)	−6 (21)	−5.4 (22.3)	−0.6 (30.9)	8.4 (47.1)	14.9 (58.8)	18.5 (65.3)	21 (70)	20.1 (68.2)	14.1 (57.4)	7.4 (45.3)	1.3 (34.3)	−3 (27)	7.6 (45.6)
Mean daily minimum °C (°F)	−8.4 (16.9)	−8.6 (16.5)	−4.7 (23.5)	2.9 (37.2)	9.2 (48.6)	13.1 (55.6)	15.9 (60.6)	15 (59)	9.8 (49.6)	4.1 (39.4)	−1 (30)	−5.2 (22.6)	3.5 (38.3)
Average precipitation mm (inches)	51 (2.0)	44 (1.7)	48 (1.9)	50 (2.0)	63 (2.5)	70 (2.8)	74 (2.9)	54 (2.1)	57 (2.2)	57 (2.2)	47 (1.9)	49 (1.9)	664 (26.1)
Source: https://en.climate-data.org/asia/russian-federation/kursk-oblast/чапли-745734/

== Transport ==
Chapli is located 2 km from the road of regional importance 38K-017 (Kursk – Lgov – Rylsk – border with Ukraine), on the road of intermunicipal significance 38H-376 (38K-017 – Chapli – Blagodatnoye), 3 km from the nearest railway station Blokhino (railway line Lgov I — Kursk).

The rural locality is situated 54 km from Kursk Vostochny Airport, 130 km from Belgorod International Airport and 256 km from Voronezh Peter the Great Airport.
