= Age of acquisition =

Psycholinguistic variable

Age of acquisition (AOA or AoA) is a psycholinguistic variable referring to the age at which a word is typically learned. For example, the word 'penguin' is typically learned at a younger age than the word 'albatross'. Studies in psycholinguistics suggest that age of acquisition has an effect on the speed of reading words. The findings have demonstrated that early-acquired words are processed more quickly than later-acquired words. It is a particularly strong variable in predicting the speed of picture naming. It has been generally found that words that are more frequent, shorter, more familiar and refer to concrete concepts are learned earlier than the counterparts in simple words and compound words, together with their respective lexemes. In addition, the AoA effect has been demonstrated in several languages and in bilingual speakers.

== Norms ==
Sets of normative values for age of acquisition for large sets of words have been developed.

- Kuperman, Stadthagen-Gonzalez, and Brysbaert
- Gilhooly and Logie.
- Morrison et al.
- Juhasz et al.
- Sereno et al.

== Relation to other variables ==
It has been disputed whether age of acquisition has an effect on word tasks on its own or by virtue of its covariance with other variables such as word frequency. Alternatively, it has been suggested that the age of acquisition is related to the fact that an earlier learned word has been encountered more often. These issues were partially resolved in an article by Ghyselinck, Lewis and Brysbaert.

Alternatively there have been discussions of the effect that the age of acquisition has on memory. The influence of AoA on recognition memory is likely to be present, using a pure and mixed lists. However, the AoA effect is not likely to be present in free recall tasks. However, there is evidence indicating that the AoA is present in free recall in compound words. One explanation for this is that disyllabic words such as compound words have more irregular spelling-to-sound correspondence, thus semantics is more likely to take place, while monomorphemic items have a more regular spelling-to-sound correspondence, thus semantics is less likely to take place.

== Theories on the age-of-acquisition effects ==
=== Representation theory ===
The AoA effects could be attributed to incremental construction of semantic representations. Early-acquired words develop stronger connections with other words as they have richer semantic representations, and are thus more resistant to cognitive impairment. However, the AoA effect has been argued to be the result of perceptual-semantic representation where the brain maps visual features of individual constituents as opposed to solely a perceptual root or a semantic root.. However, the AoA effect is observed to occur in non-linguistic domains that are similar to language such as faces. However, the AoA effect may not be identical in musical domains, unless lexical access is necessitated. Here we observe that AoA effect is absent in a purely auditory task but requires the participants to discriminate between melodies, whereas when the title of the melody is included, we observe melodies acquired later in life are recognized faster and more accurately. This indicates that the musical lexicon is organized by semantic distinctiveness, an argument made to research on memory research.

=== Mapping theory ===
The AoA effects result from reduced neuroplasticity during the learning of mappings between representations over time. Early-acquired words use the rich resources available in the system, while late-acquired words need to fitted into the system already tuned to early-acquired words. Consequently, there is a processing cost for late-acquired words, especially for those having mapping structures that are different to early-acquired words. Opaque or deep languages such as English are more likely to show AoA effects, as a result of this mapping between letter and sound being irregular in opaque languages, leading to a larger AoA effects, whereas transparent or shallow languages such as Spanish are more likely to demonstrate small or no AoA effects, as the mapping between letter and sound is regular and late-acquired words can benefit from the structure created by early-acquired words.

=== Integrated theory ===
This theory argued that the AoA effect could be explained by both the representation theory and mapping theory such that the AoA effect is observed as a consequence of incremental learning, resulting from both the construction of representations and changing plasticity in the learning system. Early-acquired words use the rich resources available in the system to develop stronger connections with newer words, thus developing richer semantic representations, while late-acquired words have to tune to early-acquired words and thus have fewer connections to other words. In turn, the late-acquired word not only has a different mapping structure but also a processing cost.

Chang et al. argued that in contrast to written words, which has an often arbitrary relationship between letters and sounds, the strong connection between phonology and semantics is crucial for reading. The relationship between sound production and perception are more consistent, allowing readers to leverage their spoken language skills to decode written words. Children exploit this phonology-semantics link to read words, encountered before formal literacy instructions, using the indirect route to sound words and access their meanings. As a result, the regularity of phonology provides a significant advantage over written language systems. This inherent consistency contributes to he effectiveness of phonological decoding strategies in reading. As a result, the link between mapping and semantics highlights the value of the integrated theory.

However, we need to consider orthographic transparency. Within opaque languages, the AoA can differ depending on the level of imageability (i.e. how imageable an item is). If the item has high imageability, the AoA effect is more likely to be small or non-existent, whereas if the item has low imageability, the AoA effect is more likely to be large. In transparent languages such as Spanish, if the item has low imageability, the AoA effect will not be evident, whereas if the item has high imageability, the AoA will be demonstrated.
