= Sentence processing =

Process of understanding speech

Sentence processing takes place whenever a reader or listener processes a language utterance, either in isolation or in the context of a conversation or a text. Many studies of the human language comprehension process have focused on reading of single utterances (sentenced) without context. Extensive research has shown that language comprehension is affected by context preceding a given utterance as well as many other factors.

== Ambiguity ==
Sentence comprehension has to deal with ambiguity in spoken and written utterances, for example lexical, structural, and semantic ambiguities. Ambiguity is ubiquitous, but people usually resolve it so effortlessly that they do not even notice it. For example, the sentence Time flies like an arrow has (at least) the interpretations Time moves as quickly as an arrow, A special kind of fly, called time fly, likes arrows and Measure the speed of flies like you would measure the speed of an arrow. Usually, readers will be aware of only the first interpretation. Educated readers though, spontaneously think about the arrow of time but inhibit that interpretation because it deviates from the original phrase and the temporal lobe acts as a switch.

Instances of ambiguity can be classified as local or global ambiguities. A sentence is globally ambiguous if it has two distinct interpretations. Examples are sentences like Someone shot the servant of the actress who was on the balcony (was it the servant or the actress who was on the balcony?) or The cop chased the criminal with a fast car (did the cop or the criminal have a fast car?). Comprehenders may have a preferential interpretation for either of these cases, but syntactically and semantically, neither of the possible interpretations can be ruled out.

Local ambiguities persist only for a short amount of time as an utterance is heard or written and are resolved during the course of the utterance so the complete utterance has only one interpretation. Examples include sentences like The critic wrote the book was enlightening, which is ambiguous when The critic wrote the book has been encountered, but was enlightening remains to be processed. Then, the sentence could end, stating that the critic is the author of the book, or it could go on to clarify that the critic wrote something about a book. The ambiguity ends at was enlightening, which determines that the second alternative is correct.

When readers process a local ambiguity, they settle on one of the possible interpretations immediately without waiting to hear or read more words that might help decide which interpretation is correct (the behaviour is called incremental processing). If readers are surprised by the turn the sentence really takes, processing is slowed and is visible for example in reading times. Locally-ambiguous sentences have, therefore, been used as test cases to investigate the influence of a number of different factors on human sentence processing. If a factor helps readers to avoid difficulty, it is clear that the factor plays a factor in sentence processing.

== Theories ==
Experimental research has spawned a large number of hypotheses about the architecture and mechanisms of sentence comprehension. Issues like modularity versus interactive processing and serial versus parallel computation of analyses have been theoretical divides in the field.

=== Architectural issues ===
==== Modular vs. interactive ====
A modular view of sentence processing assumes that each factor involved in sentence processing is computed in its own module, which has limited means of communication with the other modules. For example, syntactic analysis creation takes place without input from semantic analysis or context-dependent information, which are processed separately. A common assumption of modular accounts is a feed-forward architecture in which the output of one processing step is passed on to the next step without feedback mechanisms that would allow the output of the first module to be corrected. Syntactic processing is usually taken to be the most basic analysis step, which feeds into semantic processing and the inclusion of other information. A separate mental module parses sentences and lexical access happens first. Then, one syntactic hypothesis is considered at a time. There is no initial influence of meaning, or semantic. Sentence processing is supported by a temporo-frontal network. Within the network, temporal regions subserve aspects of identification and frontal regions the building of syntactic and semantic relations. Temporal analyses of brain activation within this network support syntax-first models because they reveal that building of syntactic structure precedes semantic processes and that these interact only during a later stage.

Interactive accounts assume that all available information is processed at the same time and can immediately influence the computation of the final analysis. In the interactive model of sentence processing, there is no separate module for parsing. Lexical access, syntactic structure assignment, and meaning assignment happen at the same time in parallel. Several syntactic hypotheses can be considered at a time. The interactive model demonstrates an on-line interaction between the structural and lexical and phonetic levels of sentence processing. Each word, as it is heard in the context of normal discourse, is immediately entered into the processing system at all levels of description, and is simultaneously analyzed at all these levels in the light of whatever information is available at each level at that point in the processing of the sentence. Interactive models of language processing assume that information flows both bottom-up and top-down, so that the representations formed at each level may be influenced by higher as well as lower levels. A framework called the interactive activation framework that embeds this key assumption among others, including the assumption that influences from different sources are combined nonlinearly. The nonlinearity means that information that may be decisive under some circumstances may have little or no effect under other conditions. In the interactive activation framework, the knowledge that guides processing is stored in the connections between units on the same and adjacent levels. The processing units that they connect may receive input from a number of different sources, which allows the knowledge that guides processing to be completely local while, at the same time, allowing the results of processing at one level to influence processing at other levels, both above and below. A basic assumption of the framework is that processing interactions are always reciprocal; it is this bi-directional characteristic that makes the system interactive. Bi-directional excitatory interactions between levels allow mutual simultaneous constraint among adjacent levels, and bi-directional inhibitory interactions within a level allow for competition among mutually incompatible interpretations of a portion of an input. The between-level excitatory interactions are captured in the models in two-way excitatory connections between mutually compatible processing units. Syntactic ambiguities are in fact based at the lexical level. In addition, more recent studies with more sensitive eye tracking machines have shown early context effects. Frequency and contextual information will modulate the activation of alternatives even when they are resolved in favor of the simple interpretation. Structural simplicity is cofounded with frequency, which goes against the garden path theory

==== Serial vs. parallel ====
Serial accounts assume that humans construct only one of the possible interpretations at first and try another only if the first one turns out to be wrong. Parallel accounts assume the construction of multiple interpretations at the same time. To explain why comprehenders are usually only aware of one possible analysis of what they hear, models can assume that all analyses ranked, and the highest-ranking one is entertained.

=== Models ===
There are a number of influential models of human sentence processing that draw on different combinations of architectural choices.

==== Garden path model ====
The garden path model (Frazier 1987) is a serial modular parsing model. It proposes that a single parse is constructed by a syntactic module. Contextual and semantic factors influence processing at a later stage and can induce re-analysis of the syntactic parse. Re-analysis is costly and leads to an observable slowdown in reading. When the parser encounters an ambiguity, it is guided by two principles: late closure and minimal attachment. The model has been supported with research on the early left anterior negativity, an event-related potential often elicited as a response to phrase structure violations.

Late closure causes new words or phrases to be attached to the current clause. For example, "John said he would leave yesterday" would be parsed as John said (he would leave yesterday), and not as John said (he would leave) yesterday (i.e., he spoke yesterday).

Minimal attachment is a strategy of parsimony: The parser builds the simplest syntactic structure possible (that is, the one with the fewest phrasal nodes).

==== Constraint-based model ====
Constraint-based theories of language comprehension emphasize how people make use of the vast amount of probabilistic information available in the linguistic signal. Through statistical learning, the frequencies and distribution of events in linguistic environments can be picked upon, which inform language comprehension. As such, language users are said to arrive at a particular interpretation over another during the comprehension of an ambiguous sentence by rapidly integrating these probabilistic constraints.

==== Good enough theory ====
The good enough approach to language comprehension, developed by Fernanda Ferreira and others, assumes that listeners do not always engage in full detailed processing of linguistic input. Rather, the system has a tendency to develop shallow and superficial representations when confronted with some difficulty. The theory takes an approach that somewhat combines both the garden path model and the constraint based model. The theory focuses on two main issues. The first is that representations formed from complex or difficult material are often shallow and incomplete. The second is that limited information sources are often consulted in cases where the comprehension system encounters difficulty. The theory can be put to test using various experiments in psycholinguistics that involve garden path misinterpretation, etc.

== Methods ==
=== Behavioral tasks ===
In behavioral studies, subjects are often presented with linguistic stimuli and asked to perform an action. For example, they may be asked to make a judgment about a word (lexical decision), reproduce the stimulus, or name a visually presented word aloud. Speed (often reaction time: time taken to respond to the stimulus) and accuracy (proportion of correct responses) are commonly employed measures of performance in behavioral tasks. Researchers infer that the nature of the underlying process(es) required by the task gives rise to differences; slower rates and lower accuracy on these tasks are taken as measures of increased difficulty. An important component of any behavioral task is that it stays relatively true to 'normal' language comprehension—the ability to generalize the results of any task is restricted when the task has little in common with how people actually encounter language.

A common behavioral paradigm involves priming effects, wherein participants are presented first with a prime and then with a target word. The response time for the target word is affected by the relationship between the prime and the target. For example, Fischler (1977) investigated word encoding using the lexical decision task. She asked participants to make decisions about whether two strings of letters were English words. Sometimes the strings would be actual English words requiring a "yes" response, and other times they would be nonwords requiring a "no" response. A subset of the licit words were related semantically (e.g., cat-dog) while others were unrelated (e.g., bread-stem). Fischler found that related word pairs were responded to faster when compared to unrelated word pairs, which suggests that semantic relatedness can facilitate word encoding.

=== Eye-movements ===
Eye tracking has been used to study online language processing. This method has been influential in informing knowledge of reading. Additionally, Tanenhaus et al. (1995) established the visual world paradigm, which takes advantage of eye movements to study online spoken language processing. This area of research capitalizes on the linking hypothesis that eye movements are closely linked to the current focus of attention.

=== Neuroimaging and evoked potentials ===
The rise of non-invasive techniques provides myriad opportunities for examining the brain bases of language comprehension. Common examples include positron emission tomography (PET), functional magnetic resonance imaging (fMRI), event-related potentials (ERPs) in electroencephalography (EEG) and magnetoencephalography (MEG), and transcranial magnetic stimulation (TMS). These techniques vary in their spatial and temporal resolutions (fMRI has a resolution of a few thousand neurons per pixel, and ERP has millisecond accuracy), and each type of methodology presents a set of advantages and disadvantages for studying a particular problem in language comprehension.

=== Computational modeling ===
Computational modeling is another means by which to explore language comprehension. Models, such as those instantiated in neural networks, are particularly useful because they requires theorists to be explicit in their hypotheses and because they can be used to generate accurate predictions for theoretical models that are so complex that they render discursive analysis unreliable. A classic example of computational modeling in language research is McClelland and Elman's TRACE model of speech perception. A model of sentence processing can be found in Hale (2011)'s 'rational' Generalized Left Corner parser. This model derives garden path effects as well as local coherence phenomena. Computational modeling can also help to relate sentence processing to other functions of language. For example, one model of ERP effects in sentence processing (e.g., N400 and P600) argues that these phenomena arise out learning processes that support language acquisition and linguistic adaptation.

== See also ==
- Language processing
- Neurolinguistics
- Parsing
- Prediction in language comprehension
- Psycholinguistics
- Reading
- Reading comprehension
- Speech perception
