= Declarative learning =

Declarative learning is acquiring information that one can speak about (contrast with motor learning). The capital of a state is a declarative piece of information, while knowing how to ride a bike is not. Episodic memory and semantic memory are a further division of declarative information.

== Overview ==
There are two ways to learn a telephone number: memorize it using your declarative memory, or use it many times to create a habit. Habit learning is called procedural memory.

Declarative memory uses your medial temporal lobe and enables you to recall the telephone number at will. Procedural memory activates the telephone number only when you are at the telephone, and uses your right-hemisphere's skill, pattern recognition.

Research indicates declarative and habit memory compete with each other during distraction. When in doubt, the brain chooses habit memory because it is automatic.

Several researchers at the UCLA tested the hypothesis that distraction can change the way a task is learned. In their experiment, they played a series of high and low tones while asking subjects to do a simple probabilistic classification task. In the single task (ST) case, subjects only learned to predict the weather. In the dual task (DT) case, subjects were also asked to count the number of high pitched tones. The ability to use the learned knowledge was found to be about the same in either case. However, subjects were significantly better at identifying cue-associations (a test of declarative knowledge) when trained under ST rather than DT conditions. Furthermore, fMRI showed activity in the hippocampus was associated with performance under ST, but not DT conditions, whereas activity in the putamen showed the opposite correlation. The authors concluded that while distraction may not decrease the level of learning, it can result in a reduced ability to flexibly use that knowledge

== Empirical evidence ==
Declarative learning is an important skill that we use to acquire new information, such as in education. Declarative learning can be seen as what we know, for example we know that Paris is the capital of France.

=== Children ===
Sleep deprivation and learning have continually been linked together. The common belief is that sleep deprivation can affect children when they are learning at school or in any daily task. However, different types of learning are processed differently and have different outcomes when a child is sleep deprived. A study conducted by Csabi, Benedk, Janacesk, Katona and Nemeth looked at the impairment of declarative and nondeclarative learning when a child is sleep-deprived. Nondeclarative learning was measured by having children perform an Alternating Serial Reaction Time (ASRT) task. This task had a dog's head appear in four empty circles. Every time the dog's head appeared the child had to press the corresponding letter as quickly and correctly as possible. Declarative learning was measured by "The War of the Ghosts" test, which is a recall test where the children were told a short story consisting of thirty-six sentences and had to then recall it immediately after hearing it. The study showed that nondeclarative learning was preserved and not affected when sleep-deprived children took the ASRT task. However, declarative learning greatly declined in the face of sleep-deprivation. Declarative Learning can be associated with tasks that require a greater amount of attention, such as learning in school. Therefore, the lack of sleep a child obtains can affect declarative learning and can affect how well a child learns during school overall.

Research focusing on children has also looked at different ways of utilizing declarative learning when it comes to memorizing tasks. Backhaus, Hoeckesfeld, Born, Hohagen, and Junghanns conducted a study to see if sleeping after a task enhances declarative learning in children. Children between the ages of nine and twelve were given a word association task consisting of forty related word pairs. The lists of words were repeated continuously until the child participating could recall at least twenty words out of the forty given. The child was allowed to go to sleep for the night and was tested for recall right after they had woken up. The child was then asked to go about their day and was tested for recall later during the day. The study showed that declarative learning, memory and retention significantly increased only after an interval of sleep that immediately followed learning. This research provides evidence of sleep in the role of declarative learning, sleep consolidation, as well as stresses the importance of sleep for declarative learning during childhood.

=== Adults ===
Declarative learning is not solely affected by sleeping but can also be affected by levels of stress as well as hormones. In a study conducted by Espin et al. stress, hormones and menstrual cycle phases in women, were tested for their effect on declarative learning in young adults. Participants were asked to participate in a Trier Social Stress Test (TSST) where they were asked to give a speech to a simulated committee about why they deserved the position for their dream job. If the participant did not finish their speech in five minutes the committee would then ask standardized questions the researchers had provided. After the speech the participant was asked to complete a five-minute arithmetic task. The TSST was set up to induce stress in the participants before they proceeded to the declarative learning task. For the Declarative Learning task the participants were asked to complete a Rey Auditory Verbal Learning Task (RAVLT), which has the participants look over a set of words and then asks them to recall as many as they can. The study showed that if women were not exposed to the TSST task before the RAVLT there was an increase of declarative learning and recall when compared to the men. However, when the participants were exposed to the TSST task before the RAVLT then declarative learning and recall were equal for both men and women. Women during the study that were menstruating and exposed to the TSST task showed lower levels of stress than women not menstruating, they also had an increase of declarative learning and recall when compared to men and women not menstruating . The study not only shows that sex hormones could reduce stress in women but also that stress can have a negative effect on declarative learning. This could affect the capability of students learning and passing their classes and also the ability to be able to complete tasks in the workplace.

Sleep benefits declarative learning across a range of tasks for children and young adults, however little is known of the role that sleep plays for adults when it comes to declarative learning. A study conducted by Wilson, Baran, Schott, Ivry and Spencer sought to see if sleep plays an important role in declarative learning and motor skill learning in adults. Participants were given two tasks to assess motor skill learning and another to assess declarative learning. The participants learned a motor sequence and list of word pairs during either the morning or evening. Memory tests were given to the participants twice, at twelve and twenty-four hours after training. This gap allowed for a period of sleep, a recall test, a period of normal wake, and a recall test. The study results showed that motor skills were not dependent on sleep. However, declarative learning tasks and recall increased when the participants slept before the recall test. The study also showed that a change in sleep patterns and networks activated during sleep may contribute to age-related decline in motor sequences but does not affect declarative learning. This study shows that even though the role of sleep may change throughout age it is still very important to declarative learning regardless of age.

Another aspect of research is seeing the importance of declarative learning in both implicit and explicit learning tasks. In a study conducted by Matthew Kirkhart undergraduate participants underwent implicit and explicit artificial-grammar learning tasks to see how declarative learning functioned in each. For the Implicit task participants were told that they would see a series of letter strings, a group of letters that appear in a word, and had to judge if the string were well formed or not well formed. For the Explicit task participants were told they had to reproduce letter strings according to a set of rules, which they had to determine and would be tested on later. The participants were then shown a series of letter strings and asked if they followed the rules or not. The results showed that declarative learning was not required for implicit learning but was related to the consistency in performance. It was seen, however, that declarative learning is required for explicit learning and consistency of performance. This shows that adults are using declarative learning when undergoing explicit tasks, such as memorizing formulas for a statistics class. This research provides more evidence of the importance of declarative learning in education for not just children but for adults as well.

== See also ==
- Descriptive knowledge
- Procedural knowledge
