= Word recognition =

Process of reading single words

Word recognition, according to Literacy Information and Communication System (LINCS) is "the ability of a reader to recognize written words correctly and virtually effortlessly". It is sometimes referred to as "isolated word recognition" because it involves a reader's ability to recognize words individually from a list without needing similar words for contextual help. LINCS continues to say that "rapid and effortless word recognition is the main component of fluent reading" and explains that these skills can be improved by "practic[ing] with flashcards, lists, and word grids".

In her 1990 review of the science of learning to read, psychologist Marilyn Jager Adams wrote that "the single immutable and nonoptional fact about skilful reading is that it involves relatively complete processing of the individual letters of print." The article "The Science of Word Recognition" says that "evidence from the last 20 years of work in cognitive psychology indicates that we use the letters within a word to recognize a word". Over time, other theories have been put forth proposing the mechanisms by which words are recognized in isolation, yet with both speed and accuracy. These theories focus more on the significance of individual letters and letter-shape recognition (ex. serial letter recognition and parallel letter recognition). Other factors such as saccadic eye movements and the linear relationship between letters also affect the way we recognize words.

An article in ScienceDaily suggests that "early word recognition is key to lifelong reading skills". There are different ways to develop these skills. For example, creating flash cards for words that appear at a high frequency is considered a tool for overcoming dyslexia. It has been argued that prosody, the patterns of rhythm and sound used in poetry, can improve word recognition.

Word recognition is a manner of reading based upon the immediate perception of what word a familiar grouping of letters represents. This process exists in opposition to phonetics and word analysis, as a different method of recognizing and verbalizing visual language (i.e. reading). Word recognition functions primarily on automaticity. On the other hand, phonetics and word analysis rely on the basis of cognitively applying learned grammatical rules for the blending of letters, sounds, graphemes, and morphemes.

Word recognition is measured as a matter of speed, such that a word with a high level of recognition is read faster than a novel one. This manner of testing suggests that comprehension of the meaning of the words being read is not required, but rather the ability to recognize them in a way that allows proper pronunciation. Therefore, context is unimportant, and word recognition is often assessed with words presented in isolation in formats such as flash cards Nevertheless, ease in word recognition, as in fluency, enables proficiency that fosters comprehension of the text being read.

The intrinsic value of word recognition may be obvious due to the prevalence of literacy in modern society. However, its role may be less conspicuous in the areas of literacy learning, second-language learning, and developmental delays in reading. As word recognition is better understood, more reliable and efficient forms of teaching may be discovered for both children and adult learners of first-language literacy. Such information may also benefit second-language learners with acquisition of novel words and letter characters. Furthermore, a better understanding of the processes involved in word recognition may enable more specific treatments for individuals with reading disabilities.

== Theories ==
=== Bouma shape ===
Bouma shape, named after the Dutch vision researcher Herman Bouma, refers to the overall outline, or shape, of a word. Herman Bouma discussed the role of "global word shape" in his word recognition experiment conducted in 1973. Theories of bouma shape became popular in word recognition, suggesting people recognize words from the shape the letters make in a group relative to each other. This contrasts the idea that letters are read individually. Instead, via prior exposure, people become familiar with outlines, and thereby recognize them the next time they are presented with the same word, or bouma.

The slower pace with which people read words written entirely in upper-case, or with alternating upper- and lower-case letters, supports the bouma theory. The theory holds that a novel bouma shape created by changing the lower-case letters to upper-case hinders a person's recall ability. James Cattell also supported this theory through his study, which gave evidence for an effect he called word superiority. This referred to the improved ability of people to deduce letters if the letters were presented within a word, rather than a mix of random letters. Furthermore, multiple studies have demonstrated that readers are less likely to notice misspelled words with a similar bouma shape than misspelled words with a different bouma shape.

Though these effects have been consistently replicated, many of their findings have been contested. Some have suggested that the reading ability of upper-case words is due to the amount of practice a person has with them. People who practice become faster at reading upper-case words, countering the importance of the bouma. Additionally, the word superiority effect might result from familiarity with phonetic combinations of letters, rather than the outlines of words, according to psychologists James McClelland and James Johnson.

=== Parallel recognition vs. serial recognition ===
Parallel letter recognition is the most widely accepted model of word recognition by psychologists today. In this model, all letters within a group are perceived simultaneously for word recognition. In contrast, the serial recognition model proposes that letters are recognized individually, one by one, before being integrated for word recognition. It predicts that single letters are identified faster and more accurately than many letters together, as in a word. However, this model was rejected because it cannot explain the word superiority effect, which states that readers can identify letters more quickly and accurately in the context of a word rather than in isolation.

=== Neural networks ===
A more modern approach to word recognition has been based on recent research on neuron functioning. The visual aspects of a word, such as horizontal and vertical lines or curves, are thought to activate word-recognizing receptors. From those receptors, neural signals are sent to either excite or inhibit connections to other words in a person's memory. The words with characters that match the visual representation of the observed word receive excitatory signals. As the mind further processes the appearance of the word, inhibitory signals simultaneously reduce activation to words in one's memory with a dissimilar appearance. This neural strengthening of connections to relevant letters and words, as well as the simultaneous weakening of associations with irrelevant ones, eventually activates the correct word as part of word recognition in the neural network.

== Physiological background ==
=== The brain ===
Using positron emission tomography (PET) scans and event-related potentials, researchers have located two separate areas in the fusiform gyrus that respond specifically to strings of letters. The posterior fusiform gyrus responds to words and non-words, regardless of their semantic context. The anterior fusiform gyrus is affected by the semantic context, and whether letter combinations are words or pseudowords (novel letter combinations that mimic phonetic conventions, ex. shing). This role of the anterior fusiform gyrus may correlate to higher processing of the word's concept and meaning. Both these regions are distinct from areas that respond to other types of complex stimuli, such as faces or colored patterns, and are part of a functionally specialized ventral pathway. Within 100 milliseconds (ms) of fixating on a word, an area of the left inferotemporal cortex processes its surface structure. Semantic information begins to be processed after 150 ms and shows widely distributed cortical network activation. After 200 ms, the integration of the different kinds of information occurs.

The accuracy with which readers recognize words depends on the area of the retina that is stimulated. Reading in English selectively trains specific regions of the left hemiretina for processing this type of visual information, making this part of the visual field optimal for word recognition. As words drift from this optimal area, word recognition accuracy declines. Because of this training, effective neural organization develops in the corresponding left cerebral hemisphere.

=== Saccadic eye movements and fixations ===
Eyes make brief, unnoticeable movements called saccades approximately three to four times per second. Saccades are separated by fixations, which are moments when the eyes are not moving. During saccades, visual sensitivity is diminished, which is called saccadic suppression. This ensures that the majority of the intake of visual information occurs during fixations. Lexical processing does, however, continue during saccades. The timing and accuracy of word recognition relies on where in the word the eye is currently fixating. Recognition is fastest and most accurate when fixating in the middle of the word. This is due to a decrease in visual acuity that results as letters are situated farther from the fixated location and become harder to see.

== Frequency effects ==
The word frequency effect suggests that words that appear the most in printed language are easier to recognize than words that appear less frequently. Recognition of these words is faster and more accurate than other words. The word frequency effect is one of the most robust and most commonly reported effects in contemporary literature on word recognition. It has played a role in the development of many theories, such as the bouma shape. Furthermore, the neighborhood frequency effect states that word recognition is slower and less accurate when the target has an orthographic neighbor that is higher in frequency than itself. Orthographic neighbors are words of all the same length that differ by only one letter of that word.

== Real world applications ==
=== Inter-letter spacing ===
Serif fonts, i.e.: fonts with small appendages at the end of strokes, hinder lexical access. Word recognition is quicker with sans-serif fonts by an average of 8 ms. These fonts have significantly more inter-letter spacing, and studies have shown that responses to words with increased inter-letter spacing were faster, regardless of word frequency and length. This demonstrates an inverse relationship between fixation duration and small increases in inter-letter spacing, most likely due to a reduction in lateral inhibition in the neural network. When letters are farther apart, it is more likely that individuals will focus their fixations at the beginning of words, whereas default letter spacing on word processing software encourages fixation at the center of words.

=== Tools and measurements ===
Both PET and functional magnetic resonance imaging (fMRI) are used to study the activation of various parts of the brain while participants perform reading-based tasks. However, magnetoencephalography (MEG) and electroencephalography (EEG) provide a more accurate temporal measurement by recording event-related potentials each millisecond. Though identifying where the electrical responses occur can be easier with an MEG, an EEG is a more pervasive form of research in word recognition. Event-related potentials help measure both the strength and the latency of brain activity in certain areas during readings. Furthermore, by combining the usefulness of the event-related potentials with eye movement monitoring, researchers are able to correlate fixations during readings with word recognition in the brain in real-time. Since saccades and fixations are indicative of word recognition, electrooculography (EOG) is used to measure eye movements and the amount of time required for lexical access to target words. This has been demonstrated by studies in which longer, less common words induce longer fixations, and smaller, less important words may not be fixated on at all while reading a sentence.

=== Learning ===
According to the LINCS website, the role of word recognition results in differences between the habits of adults and the habits of children learning how to read. For non-literate adults learning to read, many rely more on word recognition than on phonics and word analysis. Poor readers with prior knowledge concerning the target words can recognize words and make fewer errors than poor readers with no prior knowledge. Instead of blending sounds of individual letters, adult learners are more likely to recognize words automatically. However, this can lead to errors when a similarly spelled, yet different word, is mistaken for one the reader is familiar with. Errors such as these are considered to be due to the learner's experiences and exposure. Younger and newer learners tend to focus more on the implications from the text and rely less on background knowledge or experience. Poor readers with prior knowledge utilize the semantic aspects of the word, whereas proficient readers rely on only graphic information for word recognition. However, practice and improved proficiency tend to lead to a more efficient use of combining reading ability and background knowledge for effective word recognition.

The role of the frequency effect has been greatly incorporated into the learning process. While the word analysis approach is extremely beneficial, many words defy regular grammatical structures and are more easily incorporated into the lexical memory by automatic word recognition. To facilitate this, many educational experts highlight the importance of repetition in word exposure. This utilizes the frequency effect by increasing the reader's familiarity with the target word, and thereby improving both future speed and accuracy in reading. This repetition can be in the form of flash cards, word-tracing, reading aloud, picturing the word, and other forms of practice that improve the association of the visual text with word recall.

=== Role of technology ===
Improvements in technology have greatly contributed to advances in the understanding and research in word recognition. New word recognition capabilities have made computer-based learning programs more effective and reliable. Improved technology has enabled eye-tracking, which monitors individuals' saccadic eye movements while they read. This has furthered understanding of how certain patterns of eye movement increases word recognition and processing. Furthermore, changes can be simultaneously made to text just outside the reader's area of focus without the reader being made aware. This has provided more information on where the eye focuses when an individual is reading and where the boundaries of attention lie.

With this additional information, researchers have proposed new models of word recognition that can be programmed into computers. As a result, computers can now mimic how a human would perceive and react to language and novel words. This technology has advanced to the point where models of literacy learning can be digitally demonstrated. For example, a computer can now mimic a child's learning progress and induce general language rules when exposed to a list of words with only a limited number of explanations. Nevertheless, as no universal model has yet been agreed upon, the generalizability of word recognition models and its simulations may be limited.

Despite this lack of consensus regarding parameters in simulation designs, any progress in the area of word recognition is helpful to future research regarding which learning styles may be most successful in classrooms. Correlations also exist between reading ability, spoken language development, and learning disabilities. Therefore, advances in any one of these areas may assist understanding in inter-related subjects. Ultimately, the development of word recognition may facilitate the breakthrough between "learning to read" and "reading to learn".

== Citations ==
- Bouma, H., & Bouwhuis, D. (1979). Visual word recognition of three-letter words as derived from the recognition of the constituent letters" Perception & Psychophysics 25(1), 12–22. Retrieved from http://alexandria.tue.nl/repository/freearticles/734512.pdf
- Campbell, J. R., Kelly, D. L., Mullis, I. V. S., Martin, M. O., & Sainsbury, M. (2001). Framework and specifications for pirls assessment 2001 . (2nd ed., p. 6). Chestnut Hill, MA, USA: International Study Center, Lynch School of Education, Boston College. Retrieved from http://timssandpirls.bc.edu/pirls2001i/pdf/PIRLS_frame2.pdf
- Davis, S. B.; Mermelstein, P. (1980). "Comparison of parametric representations for monosyllabic word recognition in continuously spoken sentences". IEEE Transactions on Acoustics, Speech, and Signal Processing. 28 (4): 357–366. CiteSeerX 10.1.1.462.5073. doi:10.1109/tassp.1980.1163420.
- Everson, M. E. (2011). "Word recognition among learners of Chinese as a foreign language: Investigating the relationship between naming and knowing". The Modern Language Journal. 82 (2): 194–204. doi:10.1111/j.1540-4781.1998.tb01192.x.
- Grainger, J (1990). "Word frequency and neighborhood frequency effects in lexical decision and naming" (PDF). Journal of Memory and Language. 29 (2): 228–244. doi:10.1016/0749-596x(90)90074-a.
- Hauk, O.; Davis, M. H.; Ford, M.; Pulvermuller, F.; Marslen-Wilson, W. D. (2006). "The time course of visual word recognition as revealed by linear regression analysis of erp data" (PDF). NeuroImage. 30 (4): 1383–1400. doi:10.1016/j.neuroimage.2005.11.048. PMID 16460964. S2CID 17367093.
- Irwin, D (1998). "Lexical processing during saccadic eye movements". Cognitive Psychology. 36 (1): 1–27. doi:10.1006/cogp.1998.0682. PMID 9679075. S2CID 25066325.
- Kruidenier, K. (2002). Research-based principles for adult basic education reading instruction (Contract no. ED-01-PO-1037). Retrieved from National Institute for Literacy website: http://lincs.ed.gov/publications/pdf/adult_ed_02.pdf
- Larsen, K. (2004, July). The science of word recognition. Advanced Reading Technology, Microsoft Corporation, Retrieved from http://www.microsoft.com/typography/ctfonts/wordrecognition.aspx
- Literacy Information and Communication System. (n.d.). Print skills (alphabetics). Retrieved from http://lincs.ed.gov/readingprofiles/MC_Word_Recognition.htm Archived 2017-05-13 at the Wayback Machine
- Luckner, J. L.; Urbach, J. (2012). "Reading fluency and students who are deaf or hard of hearing: Synthesis of the research". Communication Disorders Quarterly. 33 (4): 230–241. doi:10.1177/1525740111412582. S2CID 145617612.
- McClelland, J. L.; Johnston, J. C. (1977). "The role of familiar units in perception of words and nonwords" (PDF). Perception & Psychophysics. 22 (3): 249–261. doi:10.3758/bf03199687. S2CID 144497014.
- Mishkin, Mortimer; Forgays; Donald (1952). "Word recognition as a function or retinal locus". Journal of Experimental Psychology. 43 (1): 43–48. doi:10.1037/h0061361. PMID 14907990.
- Moret-Tatay, C.; Perea, M. (2011). "Do serifs provide an advantage in the recognition of written words?" (PDF). Journal of Cognitive Psychology. 23 (5): 619–624. doi:10.1080/20445911.2011.546781. S2CID 8427809.
- Nazir, T. A.; Heller, D.; Sussman, C. (1992). "Letter visibility and word recognition: The optimal viewing position in printed words". Perception and Psychophysics. 52 (3): 315–328. doi:10.3758/bf03209148. PMID 1408642.
- Nobre, A.; Truett, A.; McCarthy, G. (1994). "Word recognition in the human inferior temporal lobe" (PDF). Nature. 372 (6503): 260–3. Bibcode:1994Natur.372..260N. doi:10.1038/372260a0. PMID 7969469. S2CID 11167389.
- Perea, M; Gomez, P (2012). "Subtle Increases in Interletter Spacing Facilitate the Encoding of Words during Normal Reading". PLOS ONE. 7 (10) e47568. Bibcode:2012PLoSO...747568P. doi:10.1371/journal.pone.0047568. PMC 3474730. PMID 23082178.
- Pereaa, M.; Moret-Tataya, C.; Gomezc, P. (2011). "The effects of interletter spacing in visual-word recognition". Acta Psychologica. 137 (3): 345–351. CiteSeerX 10.1.1.389.137. doi:10.1016/j.actpsy.2011.04.003. PMID 21545978.
- Priebe, S. J.; Keenan, J. M.; Miller, A. C. (2010). "How prior knowledge affects word identification and comprehension". Reading and Writing. 7: 581–6. doi:10.1007/s11145-010-9260-0. PMC 3142886. PMID 21799586.
- Ranum, O. (1998). Paul saenger's "space between words". Retrieved from http://www.ranumspanat.com/html pages/saenger.html
- Scarborough, H. S. (2009). Connecting early language and literacy to later reading (dis)abilities: Evidence, theory, and practice. In F. Fletcher-Campbell, J. Soler & G. Reid (Eds.), Approaching difficulties in literacy development: Assessment, pedagogy and programmes (1 ed., pp. 23–38). Retrieved from https://books.google.com/books?id=sfKpsYBGX2MC&dq=reading&pg=PA23 delays and language&ots=rwlKKbBdkp&sig=CfBJDpub7IyfHyf9Et6B9TlpZNk
- Sereno, S. C.; Rayner, K. (2003). "Measuring word recognition in reading: Eye movements and event-related potentials". Trends in Cognitive Sciences. 7 (11): 489–493. doi:10.1016/j.tics.2003.09.010. PMID 14585445. S2CID 7156916.
