= Word frequency effect =

The word frequency effect is a psychological phenomenon where recognition times are faster for words seen more frequently than for words seen less frequently. Word frequency depends on individual awareness of the tested language. The phenomenon can be extended to different characters of the word in non-alphabetic languages such as Chinese.

A word is considered to be high frequency if the word is commonly used in daily speech, such as the word "the". A word is considered to be low frequency if the word is not commonly used, such as the word "strait". Some languages such as Chinese have multiple levels of daily speech that impact frequency of words. There is frequency at the character level or at the word level. There is also an effect of frequency at the orthographic level. Lower frequency words benefit more from a single repetition than higher frequency words.

== Examples ==
Word	Ranking
The	1st
At	20th
So	50th
Did	70th
Got	100th
Mind	300th
Chaos	5,000th
Falkland	20,000th
Marche	45,000th
Tisane	85,000th

== Methods for measuring the word frequency effect ==
Most studies looking at the word frequency effect use eye tracking data. When words have a higher frequency, readers fixate on them for shorter amounts of time. In one study, participants' eye movements were recorded as they scanned single sentence stimuli for topic relevant words. Researchers used an EyeLink eye tracker to record the movements of the participants' eyes. Reading times were found to be longer when focusing for comprehension due to increased average fixation durations. Results showed that reading for comprehension rather than scanning for certain words took longer fixations on the text.

A second method used to measure the word frequency effect is electroencephalogram (EEG). The results collected using EEG data vary depending on the context of the word. Expected or high frequency words exhibit a reduced N400 response at the beginning of the sentence. This study found that predictable words showed a lower N400 amplitude, but did not find a significant effect of frequency. More research is needed to see how frequency affects EEG data.

A third method of measuring the word frequency effect is reaction time. Reaction time is used particularly when reading aloud. Participants pronounce words differing in frequency as fast as they can. Higher frequency words are read faster than the low frequency words. In reading development research, children that have adopted strategies to read a single word with one glance were faster than children who read words letter-by-letter, despite the word presented being classified as a high frequency word, suggesting that reading strategies are also influenced by word length.

A fourth method of measuring the word frequency effect is through cognitive testing where accuracy is one of the main variables of interest. Accuracy, ie. the participant's response is correct, can be derived from recognition memory and free recall tasks, as well as lexical decision tasks. Participants recognise and recall items that are studied differing in frequency. In recognition memory, higher-frequency words are more error prone less than lower frequency items. In free recall, higher-frequency words are less error prone than lower-frequency items.

== Cognitive influences ==
The word frequency effect changes how the brain encodes the information. Readers began spelling the higher frequency words faster than the lower frequency words when spelling the words from dictation. The length of saccade varies depending on the frequency of words and the validity of the previous (preview) word in predicting the target word. For higher frequency target words, the saccades as the reader approaches the word is longer when there is a valid preview word in front of it than for lower frequency words. When the preview word is invalid, there is no difference in saccades between high or low frequency words. Fixations follow an opposite pattern with longer fixations on low frequency words. Research has also found that high frequency words are skipped more when read than low frequency words. Gaze duration is also shorter when reading high frequency words than low frequency words. Module connections are strengthened as words increase in frequency assisting to explain differences in brain processing.

== Real world applications ==
=== Written words ===
==== Leading character effect (LCF) ====
In many languages, certain characters are used more frequently than others. Examples of more frequent characters in English are vowels, m, r, s, t...etc. In other languages such as Chinese, characters are morphemes that are individual words. More than 100,000 words in Chinese are made of the same 5,000 characters. As people process the first character of the word, they make a mental prediction of what the word is before reading the rest of the characters. If the character and other preprocessing information indicates that the word is short and familiar, the reader is more likely to skip the entire word.

The character frequency may be more important when reading than the frequency of the word as a whole. In a study examining the Chinese language, reaction times for target words with a first character that was high frequency was shorter than those with first characters that were low frequency when simply naming the Chinese word. When making a lexical decision, target words with higher LCF took longer to respond to than low LCF. An example of a high frequency character in Chinese is the character for family (家) which appears before many other characters. These effects were moderated by the predictability of the next words as well as the predictability of the target word given the previous word. The surrounding words also being high frequency results In faster reaction times particularly when the target word is high frequency as compared to low frequency words.

==== Test-taking ====
The quick recognition of a word would potentially be important during a timed written assessment. With a strict limit on time available to complete a test, the presence of higher frequency words on the assessment would be more beneficial to the test-taker than low frequency words, as the high frequency words would be recognized faster and thus time could be utilized on other areas of the assessment.

==== Bilingualism ====
With more people becoming fluent in multiple languages, the word frequency effect could present differently in a first language than a second language. One study examined differences in reading across participants who were bilingual in Spanish and English. The participants had varying levels of competence in the second language with more fluent participants demonstrating a stronger word frequency effect. As the word frequency effect increased in both languages, total reading time decreased. In L1 (first language) there were higher skipping rates than in L2 (second language). This suggests that lower frequency words in L2 were harder to process than both high and low frequency words in L1. Familiarity of the language plays a large role in reacting to the frequency of words. Reaction rates of bilingual adults could also be impacted by age. Older adults were significantly slower to respond to lower frequency words but were faster to process higher frequency words.

==== Marketing ====
The recognizability and memorability of words has implications in marketing research and business strategy. Slogans that include less frequent words are more memorable while slogans that are include more familiar words are perceived as more likeable.

=== Spoken words ===
In several studies, participants read a list of high or low frequency words along with nonwords (or pseudowords). They were tasked with pronouncing the words or nonwords as fast as possible. High frequency words were read aloud faster than low frequency words. Participants read the nonwords the slowest. More errors were made when pronouncing the low frequency words than the high frequency words.

=== Physical activities ===
==== Driving ====
Quick recognition of a word could also be important when reading road signs while driving. As a vehicle moves and passed road signs on the side of the road, there is only a short amount of time available to be able to read the road signs. The presence of higher frequency words on the road sign would allow for faster recognition and processing of road sign meaning, which could be critical in such a time sensitive situation.

== Criticisms ==
Daniel Voyer proposed some criticism for the word frequency effect in 2003 after experiments on laterality effects in lexical decisions. His experiments demonstrated two findings:

(1) Word frequency effect was only significant for the left visual field presentation
(2) In a case-altered condition, the word frequency effect meaningful for right visual field presentations.

Voyer further posits that hemispheric asymmetries may play a role in the word frequency effect.

== Future directions ==
Psycholinguists believe that future study of the word frequency effect needs to consider the role of heuristics to determine the difference in eye movements between high and low frequency words.

== See also ==
- Word lists by frequency
- tf–idf
- Missing letter effect
- Zipf's law
- Processing Fluency
