= Word list =

Bare list of a language's words in corpus linguistics

A word list is a list of words in a lexicon, generally sorted by frequency of occurrence (either by graded levels, or as a ranked list). A word list is compiled by lexical frequency analysis within a given text corpus, and is used in corpus linguistics to investigate genealogies and evolution of languages and texts. A word which appears only once in the corpus is called a hapax legomena. In pedagogy, word lists are used in curriculum design for vocabulary acquisition. A lexicon sorted by frequency "provides a rational basis for making sure that learners get the best return for their vocabulary learning effort" (Nation 1997), but is mainly intended for course writers, not directly for learners. Frequency lists are also made for lexicographical purposes, serving as a sort of checklist to ensure that common words are not left out. Some major pitfalls are the corpus content, the corpus register, and the definition of "word". While word counting is a thousand years old, with still gigantic analysis done by hand in the mid-20th century, natural language electronic processing of large corpora such as movie subtitles (SUBTLEX megastudy) has accelerated the research field.

In computational linguistics, a frequency list is a sorted list of words (word types) together with their frequency, where frequency here usually means the number of occurrences in a given corpus, from which the rank can be derived as the position in the list.

Table 1: Example lexical frequency analysis
Type	Occurrences	Rank
the	3,789,654	1st
he	2,098,762	2nd
[...]		
king	57,897	1,356th
boy	56,975	1,357th
[...]		
stringyfy	5	34,589th
[...]		
transducionalify	1	123,567th

== Methodology ==
=== Factors ===
Nation (Nation 1997) noted the incredible help provided by computing capabilities, making corpus analysis much easier. He cited several key issues which influence the construction of frequency lists:

- corpus representativeness
- word frequency and range
- treatment of word families
- treatment of idioms and fixed expressions
- range of information
- various other criteria

=== Corpora ===
==== Traditional written corpus ====
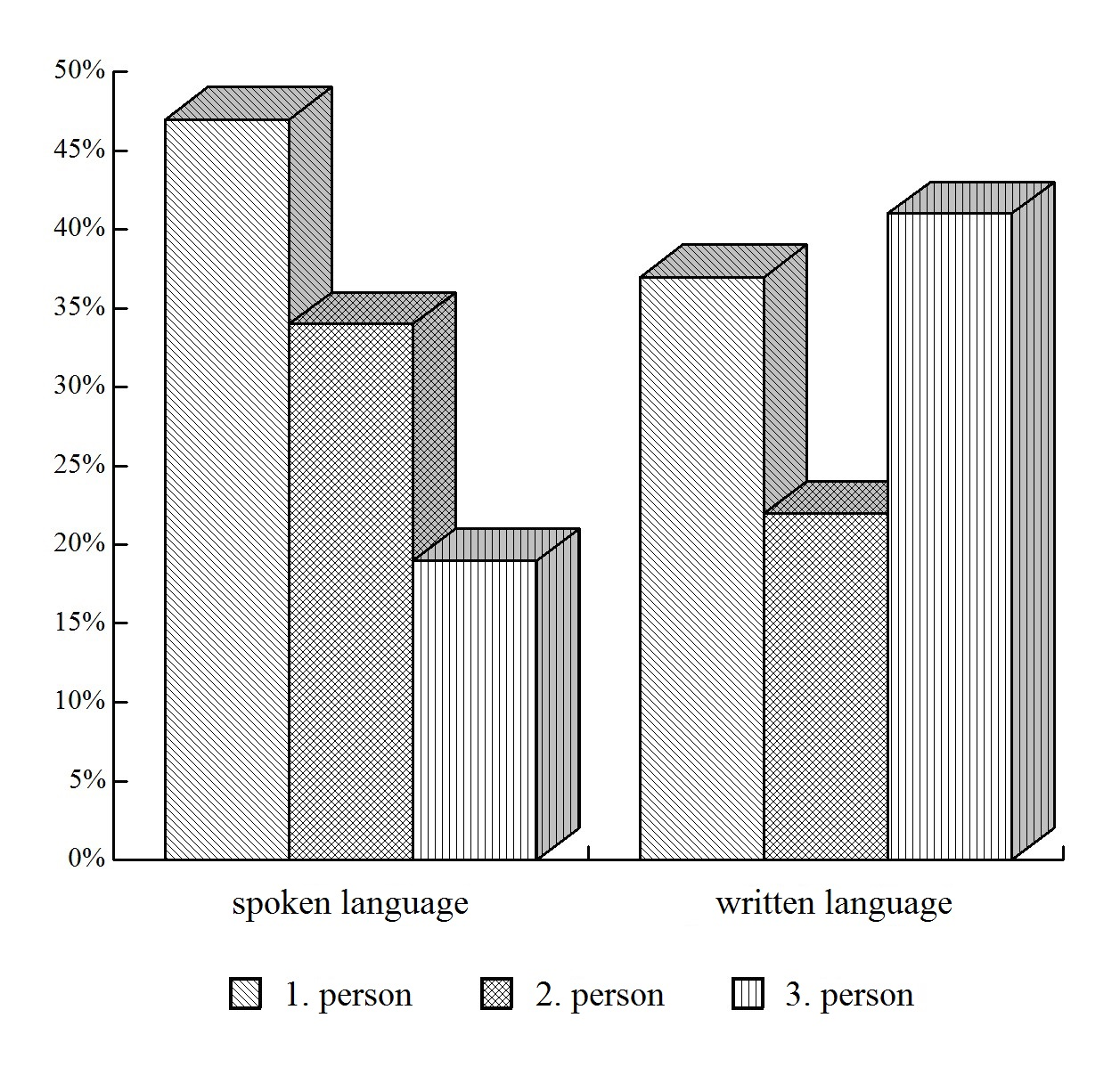
Frequency of personal pronouns in Serbo-Croatian

Most of currently available studies are based on written text corpus, more easily available and easy to process.

==== SUBTLEX movement ====
However, New et al. 2007 proposed to tap into the large number of subtitles available online to analyse large numbers of speeches. Brysbaert & New 2009 made a long critical evaluation of the traditional textual analysis approach, and support a move toward speech analysis and analysis of film subtitles available online. The initial research saw a handful of follow-up studies, providing valuable frequency count analysis for various languages. In depth SUBTLEX researches over cleaned up open subtitles were produced for French (New et al. 2007), American English (Brysbaert & New 2009; Brysbaert, New & Keuleers 2012), Dutch (Keuleers & New 2010), Chinese (Cai & Brysbaert 2010), Spanish (Cuetos et al. 2011), Greek (Dimitropoulou et al. 2010), Vietnamese (Pham, Bolger & Baayen 2011), German (Brysbaert et al. 2011), Brazil Portuguese (Tang 2012) and Portugal Portuguese (Soares et al. 2015), Albanian (Avdyli & Cuetos 2013), Polish (Mandera et al. 2014) and Catalan (2019), Welsh (Van Veuhen et al. 2024), Korean. SUBTLEX-IT (2015) provides raw data only.

=== Lexical unit ===
In any case, the basic "word" unit should be defined. For Latin scripts, words are usually one or several characters separated either by spaces or punctuation. But exceptions can arise : English "can't" and French "aujourd'hui" include punctuations while French "chateau d'eau" designates a concept different from the simple addition of its components while including a space. It may also be preferable to group words of a word family under the representation of its base word. Thus, possible, impossible, possibility are words of the same word family, represented by the base word *possib*. For statistical purpose, all these words are summed up under the base word form *possib*, allowing the ranking of a concept and form occurrence. Moreover, other languages may present specific difficulties. Such is the case of Chinese, which does not use spaces between words, and where a specified chain of several characters can be interpreted as either a phrase of unique-character words, or as a multi-character word.

=== Statistics ===
It seems that Zipf's law holds for frequency lists drawn from longer texts of any natural language. Frequency lists are a useful tool when building an electronic dictionary, which is a prerequisite for a wide range of applications in computational linguistics.

German linguists define the Häufigkeitsklasse (frequency class) $N$ of an item in the list using the base 2 logarithm of the ratio between its frequency and the frequency of the most frequent item. The most common item belongs to frequency class 0 (zero) and any item that is approximately half as frequent belongs in class 1. In the example list above, the misspelled word outragious has a ratio of 76/3789654 and belongs in class 16.

$$N=\left\lfloor0.5-\log_2\left(\frac{\text{Frequency of this item}}{\text{Frequency of most common item}}\right)\right\rfloor$$

where $\lfloor\ldots\rfloor$ is the floor function.

Frequency lists, together with semantic networks, are used to identify the least common, specialized terms to be replaced by their hypernyms in a process of semantic compression.

=== Pedagogy ===
Those lists are not intended to be given directly to students, but rather to serve as a guideline for teachers and textbook authors (Nation 1997). Paul Nation's modern language teaching summary encourages first to "move from high frequency vocabulary and special purposes [thematic] vocabulary to low frequency vocabulary, then to teach learners strategies to sustain autonomous vocabulary expansion" (Nation 2006).

== Effects of words frequency ==
Word frequency is known to have various effects (Brysbaert et al. 2011; Rudell 1993). Memorization is positively affected by higher word frequency, likely because the learner is subject to more exposures (Laufer 1997). Lexical access is positively influenced by high word frequency, a phenomenon called word frequency effect (Segui et al.). The effect of word frequency is related to the effect of age-of-acquisition, the age at which the word was learned.

== Languages ==
Below is a review of available resources.

=== English ===
Word counting is an ancient field, with known discussion back to Hellenistic time. In 1944, Edward Thorndike, Irvin Lorge and colleagues hand-counted 18,000,000 running words to provide the first large-scale English language frequency list, before modern computers made such projects far easier (Nation 1997). Projects from the twentieth century are now showing their age, especially regarding words relating to technology. For instance, "blog," which, in 2014, was #7665 in frequency in the Corpus of Contemporary American English, was not attested before 1999, and does not appear in any of the following twentieth-century lists.

The Teachers Word Book of 30,000 words (Thorndike and Lorge, 1944)
The Teacher Word Book contains 30,000 lemmas or ~13,000 word families (Goulden, Nation and Read, 1990). A corpus of 18 million written words was hand analysed. The size of its source corpus increased its usefulness, but its age, and language changes, have reduced its applicability (Nation 1997).

The General Service List (West, 1953)
The General Service List contains 2,000 headwords divided into two sets of 1,000 words. A corpus of 5 million written words was analyzed in the 1940s. The rate of occurrence (%) for different meanings, and parts of speech, of the headword are provided. Various criteria, other than frequence and range, were carefully applied to the corpus. Thus, despite its age, some errors, and its corpus being entirely written text, it is still an excellent database of word frequency, frequency of meanings, and reduction of noise (Nation 1997). This list was updated in 2013 by Dr. Charles Browne, Dr. Brent Culligan and Joseph Phillips as the New General Service List.

The American Heritage Word Frequency Book (Carroll, Davies and Richman, 1971)
A corpus of 5 million running words, from written texts used in United States schools (various grades, various subject areas). Its value is in its focus on school teaching materials, and its tagging of words by the frequency of each word, in each of the school grade, and in each of the subject areas (Nation 1997).

The Brown (Francis and Kucera, 1982) LOB and related corpora
These now contain 1 million words from a written corpus representing different dialects of English. These sources are used to produce frequency lists (Nation 1997).

=== French ===
==== Traditional datasets ====
A review has been made by New & Pallier. An attempt was made in the 1950s–60s with the Français fondamental. It includes the F.F.1 list with 1,500 high-frequency words, completed by a later F.F.2 list with 1,700 mid-frequency words, and the most used syntax rules. It is claimed that 70 grammatical words constitute 50% of the communicatives sentence, while 3,680 words make about 95~98% of coverage. A list of 3,000 frequent words is available.

The French Ministry of the Education also provide a ranked list of the 1,500 most frequent word families, provided by the lexicologue Étienne Brunet. Jean Baudot made a study on the model of the American Brown study, entitled "Fréquences d'utilisation des mots en français écrit contemporain".

More recently, the project Lexique3 provides 142,000 French words, with orthography, phonetic, syllabation, part of speech, gender, number of occurrence in the source corpus, frequency rank, associated lexemes, etc., available under an open license CC-by-sa-4.0.

==== Subtlex ====
This Lexique3 is a continuous study from which originate the Subtlex movement cited above. New et al. 2007 made a completely new counting based on online film subtitles.

=== Spanish ===
There have been several studies of Spanish word frequency (Cuetos et al. 2011).

=== Chinese ===
Chinese corpora have long been studied from the perspective of frequency lists. The historical way to learn Chinese vocabulary is based on characters frequency (Allanic 2003). American sinologist John DeFrancis mentioned its importance for Chinese as a foreign language learning and teaching in Why Johnny Can't Read Chinese (DeFrancis 1966). As a frequency toolkit, Da (Da 1998) and the Taiwanese Ministry of Education (TME 1997) provided large databases with frequency ranks for characters and words. The HSK list of 8,848 high and medium frequency words in the People's Republic of China, and the Republic of China (Taiwan)'s TOP list of about 8,600 common traditional Chinese words are two other lists displaying common Chinese words and characters. Following the SUBTLEX movement, Cai & Brysbaert 2010 recently made a rich study of Chinese word and character frequencies.

=== Other ===
Wiktionary contains frequency lists in more languages.

EZGlot lists the most frequently used words in different languages based on Wikipedia or combined corpora.

== See also ==
- Corpus linguistics
- Letter frequency
- Most common words in English
- Long tail
- Google Ngram Viewer – shows changes in word/phrase frequency (and relative frequency) over time
