= Contingent negative variation =

The contingent negative variation (CNV) is a negative slow surface potential, as measured by electroencephalography (EEG), that occurs during the period between a warning stimulus or signal and an imperative ("go") stimulus. The CNV was one of the first event-related potential (ERP) components to be described. The CNV component was first described by W. Grey Walter and colleagues in an article published in Nature in 1964. The importance of this finding was that it was one of the first studies which showed that consistent patterns of the amplitude of electric responses could be obtained from the large background noise which occurs in EEG recordings and that this activity could be related to a cognitive process such as expectancy.

== Main paradigms ==
In their study, Grey Walter et al. (1964) presented a "warning stimulus" (e.g., a single click or flash of light) to a human subject. The warning stimulus was randomly followed (or not followed) by an "imperative stimulus" (repetitive clicks or flashes) 0.5-1 second later. In some situations, the subject simply experienced warning and imperative stimuli passively; in others, the subject could prevent the imperative stimulus, if it occurred, by a behavioral response, e.g., pressing a button, but the button worked only if it was pressed after the imperative stimulus had occurred (i.e., premature button presses were ineffective). The process of warning stimulus optionally followed by imperative stimulus recurred at variable intervals between 3–10 sec.

The experimenters found that EEG responses to the warning stimulus seemed to have three phases: a brief positive component, a brief negative component, and a sustained negative component. The brief components varied with sensory modality (e.g., visual vs auditory), while the sustained component varied with the time gap between the warning and imperative stimuli (and whether the imperative stimulus occurred) and the subject's attention/vigilance. Walter et al labeled the sustained component the "contingent negative variation" because the variation of the negative wave was contingent on the statistical relationship between the warning and imperative stimuli. They observed that:

- the amplitude of the EEG response became attenuated, or habituated when the warning stimulus was repeated without a subsequent imperative stimulus;
- the amplitude returned when the imperative stimulus followed the warning stimulus;
- amplitude was more prominent in situations where the subject could exert control by preventing the imperative stimulus.

In 1990 Bozinovska et al devised a CNV-based brain-computer interface to control a computer buzzer. In 2009, Bozinovski and Bozinovska designed a CNV-based brain-computer interface experiment, where the CNV controlled a physical object, a robot.

== Component characteristics ==
Walter et al. (1964) showed that a single click elicits a brief positive peak and a brief negative peak. Repetitive flashes elicit brief positive and negative peaks. If these stimuli are separated by 1 sec the same individual patterns result. After around 50 presentations, these peaks are indistinguishable from noise. On the other hand, when a single click is followed by the repetitive flashes which are terminated by a button press, there is a large gradual negative peak which ends sharply with the button press. This is the contingent negative variation. Another classical study was described by Joseph Tecce in the Psychological Bulletin in 1972. In this review, Tecce summarizes the development, morphology, and locus of appearance of the CNV.

=== Development ===
Studies have shown that the CNV appears after about 30 trials of paired stimuli, although this number can be reduced when the subject understands the task in advance. Light flashes, clicks, and tones have all been used to elicit the CNV. A response to the imperative stimulus is necessary to elicit a clear CNV. This response could be a physical or mental response. The CNV is elicited when two, linked stimuli are presented. When the imperative stimulus is removed unexpectedly, the CNV attenuates until it is completely suppressed after about 20–50 trials. The CNV is immediately restored if paired with the imperative stimulus again.

=== Morphology ===
The negative CNV peak rises around 260–470 ms after the warning stimulus. It will rise quickly if the subject is uncertain about when the imperative stimulus will be, and it will rise gradually if the subject is confident about when the imperative stimulus will be. The maximum amplitude is usually around 20 microvolts. The scalp distribution of the CNV is further influenced by the specific demands of the prepared movement, such as a change from one to another finger of the same hand or from the left to right hand, reflecting the recruitment of different cortical areas according to changing task demands.

=== Topography ===
The CNV appears most prominently at the vertex and is bilaterally symmetrical.

== Functional sensitivity ==
There is much research which describes what stimulus characteristics can affect characteristics of the CNV. For example, intensity, modality, duration, stimulus rate, probability, stimulus relevance, and pitch discrimination can affect the CNV component.

=== Attention and expectancy ===
Attention also affects the amplitude of the CNV. The following examples from various task conditions and studies show that the CNV is changed when the experimental protocol changes the attention needed to perform the tasks. First, when subjects were told that the imperative stimulus would be removed, the CNV was reduced. Second, in one condition subjects were allowed to choose whether they were going to press the button or not. In trials where the subject chose not to respond, there was no CNV. Third, when the subject was specifically told that there would not be repetitive flashes, no CNV was elicited. Fourth, another condition showed that a CNV was elicited in subjects who were told to estimate when the repetitive flashes would come even when no flashes were presented. Fifth, when subjects were asked to pay attention and respond quickly, CNV amplitude was increased. The results of these conditions suggest that the CNV is related to attention and expectancy.

=== Probability ===
When the probability of repetitive flashes is random and the repetitive flashes are removed in about 50% of the trials, the amplitude of the CNV is about half as that of normal.

=== Intensity ===
Some researchers have shown that the intensity of the stimulus may affect the CNV amplitude. It seems that the CNV component has a higher amplitude for stimuli that have low-intensity, i.e. is difficult to see or hear, as opposed to stimuli that have high-intensity. This could be because the subject must pay more attention to perceive the low-intensity stimulus. If the detection of the imperative task becomes too difficult, then the CNV amplitude is reduced. In other words, attention to the imperative stimulus is important for the development of the CNV and increased task difficulties distract the attention.

In related studies, researchers have also shown that the larger the motoric response needed, the larger the CNV. Studies with subjects that have a lack of sleep tend to show a reduced CNV. This provides further evidence that lack of attention might decrease the CNV amplitude.

=== Interstimulus interval ===
The amplitude of the CNV changes when one changes the foreperiod, or interstimulus interval (ISI). The most frequent ISI used is between 1.0–1.5 seconds. Trials with an ISI between 0.5–1.5 elicit a robust CNV wave. When the ISI is reduced to 0.125 or 0.25 seconds, the CNV becomes suppressed. On the other hand, trials with an ISI of 4.8 seconds show reduced CNV amplitude.

== O-wave and E-wave ==
Most researchers agree that the CNV component has been associated with information processing and response preparation. The main controversy is whether the CNV is composed of more than one component. After discovery of the CNV, researchers were able to distinguish between two main components of the CNV. Loveless and Sanford (1975) and Weerts and Lang (1973) increased the interstimulus interval to greater than 3 seconds and showed that two components can be visually distinguished from the CNV. The first wave followed the warning stimulus and was called the O wave, or orienting wave. This wave showed enhanced amplitude in the frontal regions. The second wave preceded the imperative stimulus and was called the E wave, or expectancy wave. A study conducted by Gaillard (1976) provided further evidence that the O wave was frontally distributed and was more strongly affected by auditory stimuli rather than visual stimuli.

A related, important issue has been the question of whether all or part of the CNV corresponds to the readiness potential. The readiness potential is the neural preparation for motoric responses. Both components have a similar scalp distribution with a negative amplitude and are associated with a motor response. In fact, many researchers claimed that the terminal CNV, or E wave, was in fact the readiness potential, or Bereitschaftspotential. This was the general consensus until other work provided evidence that the CNV can be distinguished from the RP. First, the RP is usually lateralized to the contralateral side of the motoric response, while the CNV is usually bilateral. Second, the CNV can occur even when a motor response is not required. Third, a RP occurs without any external stimuli. This shows that the RP occurs for motor responses while the CNV occurs when two stimuli are contingent with each other.

== Localization ==
Another important topic in studying the CNV component is localizing the general source of the CNV. For example, Hultin, Rossini, Romani, Högstedt, Tecchio, and Pizzella (1996) used magnetoencephalography (MEG) to determine the location of the electromagnetic source of the CNV wave. Their experiment suggests that the terminal CNV is located within Brodmann's area 6 and corresponds to the premotor cortex.

The work done by Zappoli and colleagues is another example of research completed to determine the generators of the CNV component. Zappoli (2003) studied the ERP patterns, including the CNV, of subjects with brain disorders or brain damage. Zappoli reviews evidence which shows that in certain cases epileptic discharges affect the expectance waves and therefore decrease the CNV amplitude. Zappoli also described research which investigated the CNV characteristics in patients which had lobotomies of frontal regions. The CNV amplitudes were decreased or absent in these patients.

== Theory ==
Many theories have been posited to account for cognitive processes underlying the CNV component. Walter and colleagues suggested that CNV amplitude varies directly with subjective probability or expectancy of the imperative stimuli. Other researchers suggested that the CNV amplitude varies with the intention to perform an act. Another theory is that CNV varies with the motivation of the subject to complete the task. Tecce suggests that the CNV is related to both attention and arousal level.

== See also ==
- Bereitschaftspotential
- C1 and P1
- Difference due to memory
- Early left anterior negativity
- Error-related negativity
- Late positive component
- Lateralized readiness potential
- Mismatch negativity
- N2pc
- N100
- N170
- N200
- N400
- P3a
- P3b
- P200
- P300 (neuroscience)
- P600
- Somatosensory evoked potential
- Visual N1
