= Error-related negativity =

Electrical activity in the brain

Error-related negativity (ERN), sometimes referred to as the Ne, is a component of an event-related potential (ERP). ERPs are electrical activity in the brain as measured through electroencephalography (EEG) and time-locked to an external event (e.g., presentation of a visual stimulus) or a response (e.g. an error of commission). A robust ERN component is observed after errors are committed during various choice tasks, even when the participant is not explicitly aware of making the error; however, in the case of unconscious errors the ERN is reduced. An ERN is also observed when non-human primates commit errors.

== History ==
The ERN was first discovered in 1968 by Natalia Bekhtereva and was called "error detector". Later in 1990 ERN was developed by two independent research teams; Michael Falkenstein, J. Hohnsbein, J. Hoormann, & L. Blanke (1990) at the Institute for Work Physiology and Neurophysiology in Dortmund, Germany (who called it the "Ne"), and W.J. "Bill" Gehring, M.G.H. Coles, D.E. Meyer & E. Donchin (1990) at the University of Michigan, USA. The ERN was observed in response to errors committed by study participants during simple choice response tasks.

== Component characteristics ==
The ERN is a sharp negative going signal which begins about the same time an incorrect motor response begins, (response locked event-related potential), and typically peaks from 80 to 150 milliseconds (ms) after the erroneous response begins (or 40–80 ms after the onset of electromyographic activity). The ERN is the largest at frontal and central electrode sites. A typical method for determining the average ERN amplitude for an individual involves calculating the peak-to-peak difference in voltage between the average of the most negative peaks 1–150 ms after response onset, and the average amplitude of positive peaks 100–0 ms before response onset. For optimal resolution of the signal, reference electrodes are typically placed behind both ears using either hardware or arithmetically linked mastoid electrodes.

== Main paradigms ==
Any paradigm in which mistakes are made during motor responses can be used to measure the ERN. Natural keyboarding is one such example where typing errors are shown to elicit ERN. The most important feature of any ERN paradigm is obtaining a sufficient number of errors in the participant's responses, and the number of trials needed to obtain reliable scores can vary widely, which is particularly relevant for studies of individual differences. Early experiments identifying the component used a variety of techniques, including word and tone identification, and categorical discrimination (e.g. are the following an animal?). However, the majority of experimental paradigms that elicit ERN deflections have been a variant on the Eriksen "Flanker", and "Go/NoGo". In addition to responses with the hands, the ERN can also be measured in paradigms where the task is performed with the feet or with vocal responses as in the Stroop paradigm.

A standard Flanker task involves discerning the central "target" letter from a string of distracting "flanker" letters which surround it. For example, congruous letter strings such as "SSSSS" or "HHHHH" and incongruous letter strings such as "HHSHH" or "SSHSS" may be presented on a computer screen. Each target letter would be assigned a key stroke response on a keyboard, such as "S" = right shift key and "H" = left shift key. Presentation of each letter string is brief, generally less than 100 ms, and central on the screen. Participants have approximately 2000 ms to respond before the next presentation. The most simple Go/NoGo tasks involve assigning a property of discernment to responding "Go" or not responding "NoGo." For example, again congruous letter strings such as "SSSSS" or "HHHHH" and incongruous letter strings such as "HHSHH" or "SSHSS" may be presented on a computer screen. The participant could be instructed to respond by pressing the space bar, only for congruous strings, and to not respond when presented with incongruous letter strings. More complicated Go/NoGo tasks are usually created when the ERN is the component of interest however, because to observe the robust negativity errors must be made. The classic Stroop paradigm involves a color-word task. Color words such as "red, yellow, orange, green" are presented centrally on a computer screen either in a color congruent with the word, ("red" in the color red) or in a color incongruent with the word ("red" in the color yellow). Participants may be asked to verbalize the color each word is written in. Incongruent and congruent presentations of the words can be manipulated to different rates, such as 25/75, 50/50, 30/70 etc. Studies of ERN across flanker, Stroop, and Go/NoGo tasks support convergent validity of ERN, but convergent validity of ERN difference scores is not supported, suggesting there might task-specific differences in ERN difference scores.

== Functional sensitivity ==
The amplitude of the ERN is sensitive to the intent and motivation of participants. When a participant is instructed to strive for accuracy in responses, observed amplitudes are typically larger than when participants are instructed to strive for speed. Monetary incentives typically result in larger amplitudes as well. Latency of the ERN peak amplitude can also vary between subjects, and does so reliably in special populations such as those diagnosed with ADHD, who show shorter latencies. Participants with clinically diagnosed Obsessive Compulsive Disorder have exhibited ERN deflections with increased amplitude, prolonged latency, and a more posterior topography compared to clinically normal participants. ERN latency has been manipulated through rapid feedback, wherein participants who received rapid feedback regarding the incorrect response subsequently showed shorter ERN peak latencies. Additionally, a heightened ERN amplitude during social situations has been linked to anxiety symptoms in both childhood and adulthood.

Developmental studies have shown that the ERN emerges throughout childhood and adolescence becoming more negative in amplitude and with a more defined peak. The ERN appears to be modulated by the environment during childhood, with children who experience early adversity showing evidence of less negative ERN amplitudes.

== Theory/source ==
Although it is difficult to localize the origin of an ERP signal, extensive empirical research indicates that the ERN is most likely generated in the Anterior cingulate cortex (ACC) area of the brain. This conclusion is supported by fMRI, and brain lesion research, as well as dipole source modeling. The Dorsolateral prefrontal cortex (DLPFC) may also be involved in the generation of the ERN to some degree, and it has been found that persons with higher levels of "absent-mindedness" have their ERN sourced more from that region.

There is some debate within the field about what the ERN reflects (see especially Burle, et al.) Some researchers maintain that the ERN is generated during the detection of or response to errors. Others argue that the ERN is generated by a comparison process or a conflict monitoring system, and not specific to errors. In contrast to the above cognitive theories, new models suggest that the ERN may reflect the motivational significance of a task or perhaps the emotional reaction to making an error. This later view is consistent with findings linking errors and the ERN to autonomic arousal and defensive motivated states, and with findings suggesting that the ERN is dissociable from cognitive factors, but not affective ones. Unfortunately, it is still unclear how to interpret differences in sizes of ERN, as both smaller and larger ERN have been interpreted as "better".

== Feedback error-related negativity ==
A stimulus locked event-related potential is also observed following the presentation of negative feedback stimuli in a cognitive task indicating the outcome of a response, often referred to as the feedback ERN (fERN). This has led some researchers to extend the error-detection account of the response ERN (rERN) to a generic error detection system. This position has been elaborated into a reinforcement learning account of the ERN, arguing that both the rERN and the fERN are products of prediction error signals carried by the dopamine system arriving in the anterior cingulate cortex indicating that events have gone worse than expected. In this framework it is common to measure both the rERN and the fERN as the difference in voltage between correct and incorrect responses and feedback, respectively.

== Clinical applications ==
Debates about psychiatric disorders often become "chicken and egg" conundrums; a relationship complicated by an incomplete understanding of the functional significance of ERN. The ERN has been proposed as a potential arbitrator of this argument. A body of empirical research has shown that the ERN reflects a "trait" level difference in individual error processing; especially concerning anxiety, rather than a "state" level difference. For example; most people who experience depression do not feel depressed all of the time. Instead, they have periods of depressive "states" which may be minor and unique to an extreme situation such as death of a loved one, loss of employment, or major injury. However a person who has a depressive "trait" will have experienced more than one minor depressive "state" and usually at least one major depressive state, any of which may not be unique to an obviously extreme situation. In fact, there is some evidence, albeit weak, that people with depression show small ERNs. Scientists are exploring the use of the ERN and other ERP signals in identifying people at risk for psychiatric disorders in hopes of implementing early interventions. People with addictive behaviors such as smoking, alcoholism, and substance abuse have also shown differential ERN responses compared to individuals without the same addictive behavior.

== Pre-movement positivity ==
The ERN is often preceded by a small positive voltage deflection with a latency in the interval of −200 to −50 milliseconds in the response-locked ERP in channels over the scalp vertex, which is sometimes referred to as the "positive peak preceding the Ne" or "PNe", but more generally thought to reflect the pre-movement positivity (PMP) described by Deecke et al. (1969). The PMP is thought to reflect a "go signal" by which pre-SMA and SMA permit a motor response to be carried out. PMP is smaller before error motor responses than it is before correct motor responses, suggesting that it may be an important signal for discriminating erroneous from correct actions. Additionally, PMP is smaller in people who make more mistakes during the Flankers task and may have clinical utility in accident prone populations, such as youths with ADHD.

== Error-related positivity ==
The ERN is often followed by a positivity, known as the error-related positivity or Pe. The Pe is a positive deflection with a centro-parietal distribution. When elicited, the Pe can occur 200-500ms after making an incorrect response, following the error negativity (Ne, ERN), but is not evident on all error trials. In particular, the Pe is dependent on awareness or ability to detect errors. Pe is basically the same as the P300 wave associated with conscious sensations. Additionally, Vocat et al. (2008) established the Ne and Pe not only have different topographical distributions, but have different generators. Source localization indicates that the Ne has a dipole in the anterior cingulate cortex and the Pe has a dipole in the posterior cingulate cortex. The Pe amplitude reflects the perception of the error, meaning with more awareness of the error, the amplitude of the Pe is larger. Falkenstein and colleagues (2000) have shown that the Pe is elicited on uncorrected trials and false alarm trials, suggesting it is not directly related to error correction. It thus seems to be related to error monitoring, albeit with different neural and cognitive roots from the error-related processing reflected in the Ne.

If the Pe reflects conscious error processing, then it might be expected to be different for people with deficits in conflict monitoring, such as ADHD and OCD. Whether this is true remains controversial. Some studies do indicate these conditions are associated with different Pe responses, whereas other studies have not replicated those findings. The Pe has also been used to evaluate error processing in patients with severe brain traumatic injury. In a study using a variation of the Stroop task, patients with severe traumatic brain injury associated with deficits in error processing were found to show a significantly smaller Pe on error trials when compared against the healthy controls.

Some researchers argue that error-related negativity or error-related positivity is in fact, reward-related positivity. Reward-related positivity is also referred to as reward positivity, or RewP. It has been suggested that ERP data is depicting neural positivity to rewards (aka reward positivity) rather than neural negativity to loss (aka error-related negativity). Thus, this shift in how we conceptualize neural responses to gains/losses allows us to further understand the underlying neural processes.

== See also ==
- Bereitschaftspotential
- C1 and P1
- Contingent negative variation
- Difference due to memory
- Early left anterior negativity
- Late positive component
- Lateralized readiness potential
- Mismatch negativity
- N2pc
- N100
- N170
- N200
- N400
- P3a
- P3b
- P200
- P300 (neuroscience)
- P600
- Somatosensory evoked potential
- Visual N1
