= Early left anterior negativity =

The early left anterior negativity (commonly referred to as ELAN) is an event-related potential in electroencephalography (EEG), or component of brain activity that occurs in response to a certain kind of stimulus. It is characterized by a negative-going wave that peaks around 200 milliseconds or less after the onset of a stimulus, and most often occurs in response to linguistic stimuli that violate word-category or phrase structure rules (as in *the in room instead of in the room). As such, it is frequently a topic of study in neurolinguistics experiments, specifically in areas such as sentence processing. While it is frequently used in language research, there is no evidence yet that it is necessarily a language-specific phenomenon.

More recent work has criticized the design of many of the foundational studies that characterized the ELAN, such that apparent ELAN effects might be the result of spillover from words prior to the onset of the critical word. This raises important questions about whether the ELAN is a true ERP component or an artifact of certain experimental designs.

== Characteristics ==
The ELAN was first reported by Angela D. Friederici as a response to German sentences with phrase structure violations, such as *the pizza was in the eaten (as opposed to the pizza was eaten); it can be elicited by English phrase structure violations such as *Max's of proof (as opposed to Max's proof) or *your write (as opposed to you write). The ELAN is not elicited by sentences with other kinds of grammatical errors, such as subject-verb disagreement (*"he go to the store" rather than "he goes to the store") or grammatically dispreferred and "awkward" sentences (such as "the doctor charged the patient was lying" rather than "the doctor charged that the patient was lying"); it only appears when it is impossible to build local phrase structure.

It appears rapidly, peaking between 100 and 300 milliseconds after the onset of the grammatically incorrect stimulus (other reports have placed its time course, or latency, between 100 and 200ms, "under 200ms", "around 125 ms", or "about 160ms"). The speed of the ELAN may also be affected by characteristic of the violating stimuli; the ELAN appears later to visual stimuli that are fuzzy or difficult to see, and may occur earlier in morphologically complex spoken words where much information about the meaning of the word precedes the word's recognition point.

Its name derives from the fact that it is picked up most robustly by EEG sensors on the left front regions of the scalp; it may sometimes, however, have a bilateral (both sides of the scalp) distribution.

Some authors consider the ELAN to be a separate response from the left anterior negativity (LAN), while others label it as just an early version of the LAN.

The ELAN has been reported in languages such as English, German, Dutch, Chinese, and Japanese. It is possible, though, that it is not a response specific to language (in other words, that the ELAN might also occur in response to non-linguistic stimuli).

== Use in neurolinguistics ==
The ELAN response has played an important role in studies of sentence processing, particularly in the development of the so-called "serial model" or "syntax-first model" of sentence processing. According to this model, the brain's first step in processing sentences is to organize input and build local phrase structure (for example, to take the words the and pizza and organize them into a noun phrase the pizza), and it does not process semantic information or meaning until after this step has succeeded. This model predicts that if the initial building of local phrase structure fails (as in the above examples *Max's of proof and *your write) then semantic processing (the brain's interpretation of the meaning of the sentence) does not go forward. This has been tested by taking advantage of two brain responses: the ELAN, which reflects the phrase-structure-building, and the N400, which reflects semantic processing; the model predicts that sentences eliciting an ELAN (a violation of local phrase structure) will not elicit an N400, since the building of phrase structure is a prerequisite for semantic processing. These types of studies have had subjects read or listen to sentences that have both a syntactic and semantic violation in the same place. Some such studies have found such sentences to elicit an ELAN and no N400, thus supporting the claim of the "serial model", while others have found both an ELAN and an N400, challenging the model.

== See also ==
=== Other language-related ERPs ===
- N400
- P600

=== Other ERP components ===
- Bereitschaftspotential
- C1 and P1
- Contingent negative variation
- Difference due to memory
- Error-related negativity
- Late positive component
- Lateralized readiness potential
- Mismatch negativity
- N2pc
- N100
- N170
- N200
- P3a
- P3b
- P200
- P300 (neuroscience)
- Somatosensory evoked potential
- Visual N1
