= Visual N1 =

An EEG waveform showing a typical N100 peak

The visual N1 is a visual evoked potential, a type of event-related electrical potential (ERP), that is produced in the brain and recorded on the scalp. The N1 is so named to reflect the polarity and typical timing of the component. The "N" indicates that the polarity of the component is negative with respect to an average mastoid reference. The "1" originally indicated that it was the first negative-going component, but it now better indexes the typical peak of this component, which is around 150 to 200 milliseconds post-stimulus. The N1 deflection may be detected at most recording sites, including the occipital, parietal, central, and frontal electrode sites. Although, the visual N1 is widely distributed over the entire scalp, it peaks earlier over frontal than posterior regions of the scalp, suggestive of distinct neural and/or cognitive correlates. The N1 is elicited by visual stimuli, and is part of the visual evoked potential – a series of voltage deflections observed in response to visual onsets, offsets, and changes. Both the right and left hemispheres generate an N1, but the laterality of the N1 depends on whether a stimulus is presented centrally, laterally, or bilaterally. When a stimulus is presented centrally, the N1 is bilateral. When presented laterally, the N1 is larger, earlier, and contralateral to the visual field of the stimulus. When two visual stimuli are presented, one in each visual field, the N1 is bilateral. In the latter case, the N1's asymmetrical skewedness is modulated by attention. Additionally, its amplitude is influenced by selective attention, and thus it has been used to study a variety of attentional processes.

== History ==
Although the N1 is an early visual component that is part of the normal response to visual stimulation, it has been studied most extensively with respect to its sensitivity to selective attention. Initial studies focusing on the modulation of the N1 amplitude with respect to attention found limited evidence for N1 attention effects. However, uncertainty about the relationship between N1 amplitude and attention was resolved by Haider, Spong, and Lindsley's (1964) groundbreaking study in which levels of attention were found to systematically relate to variation in the amplitude of the N1. Specifically, Haider et al. (1964) employed a vigilance task requiring visual discrimination and response to ensure that participants attended to the stimuli, instead of passively observing the visual images. Participants observed an array of light flashes and were told to respond with a button press to dim flashes. These dim flashes were interspersed with brighter flashes that did not require a response. The experiment lasted for approximately 100 minutes, and, typical of this type of vigilance task, accurate responding to the dim flashes decreased over time, which is indicative of the decline in attention across the experiment. Importantly, the amplitude of the N1 systematically varied with the response to the dim flashes. As accuracy and attention decreased, the amplitude of the N1 decreased, suggesting that the amplitude of the N1 is intimately tied to levels of attention.

Subsequent studies employing different attention manipulations found similar results, providing further support for the link between the N1 and attention. In one study, subjects directed attention to different types of visual stimuli, and the amplitude of the N1 to the visual stimuli varied according to whether they were attended. More specifically, the N1 was greater for stimuli that were attended to versus those that were ignored. A later study by Van Voorhis & Hillyard (1977) examined amplitude changes in the N1 during a task in which light flashes were concurrently delivered to the left or right visual field in independently random sequences. Subjects were instructed to attend left, attend right, or attend to both fields. Enhancement of the N1 at the occipital site was found when attention was directed to the field in which light flashes were delivered. In comparison, the N1 were smaller for flashes that occurred in the field opposite of attentional focus. When attention was divided between the left and right fields, the N1 amplitude was intermediate. Thus, visual information at attended locations appeared to be amplified. The attention-related modulation of the N1 produced evidence of selective visual attention similar to the attention effect discovered in the auditory modality, in which the auditory N100 varies according to selective attention within the auditory field.

== Main paradigms ==
Filtering Paradigm

After the amplitude of the N1 was found to vary according to levels of attention, researchers became interested in how identical stimuli were perceived when they were attended versus unattended. An experimental paradigm, sometimes referred to as the Filtering Paradigm, was developed to assess how attention influences perception of stimuli. In the Filtering Paradigm, participants are instructed to focus their attention on either the right or left visual field of a computer screen. The visual field is typically counterbalanced within subjects across trials or experimental blocks. Thus, for the first set of trials, participants may pay attention to the right visual field, but subsequently they may pay attention to the left visual field. Within each trial and across visual fields, participants are presented with the same stimuli, for example flashes of lights varying in duration. Participants are told that when a particular stimulus, such as a short duration flash of light, referred to as a target, appears in the visual field they are attending, they should respond with a button press. The number of targets within each visual field is less than that number of non-targets, and participants are also told to ignore the other visual field and to not respond to the targets presented in that visual field. When targets in the attended visual field are compared to targets in the unattended visual field, the unattended targets are found to elicit a smaller N1 than the attended targets, suggesting that attention acts as a sensory gain mechanism that enhances perception of attended (vs. unattended) stimuli.

Visuospatial Cuing Paradigm

In Visuospatial Cuing Paradigms, attention is cued to one area of the computer screen, but the validity of the cue with respect to the presentation of the target stimulus varies. Thus, this paradigm provides insight into how putting attention in the correct versus incorrect location influences the amplitude of the N1. For example, participants are presented with a visual array in which there are four boxes at the upper and lower right- and left-hand corners of the computer screen. In the first frame of the visual display, they are told to fixate on a small dotted line in the center of the computer screen. To prepare participants to locate the cue, a warning frame follows in which the dotted line is replaced with a cross. The warning frame is followed by the cued frame, in which an arrow points in the direction of one or all four of the squares. In some cases, the cue is accurate and points to the square in which the target will be presented. In other cases, the cue is inaccurate and points to the square in which the target will not be presented. In the remaining cases, a neutral cue that points in the direction of all the squares is presented. Next, a target frame is displayed in which a small dot appears in one of the four squares. In the last frame, an arrow points to one of the four squares and participants respond with a button press to whether the cue appeared in the square. The amplitude of the N1 varies with respect to accurately cued, inaccurately cued, and neutrally cued trials. In trials in which attention was directed toward the square in which the target was presented (accurately cued trials), the amplitude of the N1 is larger than in both a) trials in which attention was directed to all squares (neutrally cued trials) and b) trials in which attention was directed to the wrong square (inaccurately cued trials), suggesting that the amplitude of the N1 represents a benefit for placing attention in the correct location.

== Factors that influence amplitude and latency ==
The amplitude, or the size, of the N1 is measured by taking the average voltage within the window that typically encompasses the N1 (about 150 to 200 ms post-stimulus). Because the N1 is a negative-going component, "larger" amplitudes correspond to being more negative, whereas "smaller" amplitudes correspond to being less negative.

Research has suggested that the amplitude of N1 is affected by certain visual parameters, including stimulus angularity and luminance, both of which are directly related to the size of N1. The amplitude of N1 is also greater in response to stimuli in attended vs. unattended locations. Conversely, amplitude is decreased when the interstimulus interval (i.e., the amount of time between successive presentations of stimuli) is increased for stimuli at attended locations. Amplitude effects on the N1 are absent during simple Reaction Time tasks, which only require subjects to make a rapid response to stimuli. This finding suggests that N1 is linked to visual discrimination processes.

Researchers interested in understanding selection effects of attention have been especially interested in amplitude variation of the N1 because amplitude differences are believed to represent a gain control mechanism (see Filtering Paradigm above). For example, because the amplitude of the N1 for targets in unattended visual fields is smaller than for targets in attended visual fields, it is believed that attention serves to amplify the processing of sensory inputs from attended locations and suppress sensory inputs from unattended locations. Thus, amplitude differences in the N1 are useful in providing evidence for whether attention serves to select certain types of sensory stimuli for further processing.

One of the factors that influences the latency of N1 is processing effort: N1 latency increases as effort at processing is also increased. Specifically, latency seems to increase during tasks that are significantly complex or difficult and, thus, require greater active attention or effort. For example, the onset, peak, and offset latencies of the N1 occur significantly earlier in response to moving stimuli in a simple detection task vs. an identification task. N1 is also sensitive to the manipulation of a visual stimulus' intensity. N1's peak latency is shortened as the brightness of stimulus flashes is increased. Therefore, it appears that N1 latency is affected by perceptual factors, such as flash intensity, as well as the level of attentional demand or processing effort.

Color and motion

Amplitude differences in the N1 have provided evidence that attention allows for more extensive analysis of visual information, such as color and motion. For example, in a Filtering Paradigm (see description above), participants were instructed to identify targets based on either color or motion. In some cases, participants were told to attend to one side of the visual field, while in other cases participants' attention was not focused on one side of the visual field. It was found that the amplitude of the N1 was greater for targets of the correct color and motion when participants were instructed to attend to one side of the visual field versus when they were not instructed to do so. These findings suggest that attention to a particular location serves to facilitate further processing of visual information and suppress further visual processing in unattended locations.

Objects and location

Although spatial attention has been shown to be unique in selection for perceptual information that will be further processed, objects have also been shown to be important in filtering information for further processing. For example, in a Filtering Paradigm (see above), rectangles were presented on either side of the visual field. Participants were directed to attend to one side of the visual field and to the top 50% of the object within that visual field. The target was a shaded region of the top right-hand side corner; however, similar targets were presented in the unattended bottom half of the object in the attended visual field and in the top and bottom halves of the object in the unattended visual field. As expected, when comparing targets in the attended visual field to targets in the unattended visual field, it was found that the amplitude of the N1 was greater for attended (vs. unattended) objects. Additionally, although the amplitude of the N1 was greatest for targets in the attended visual field and the attended part of object, the amplitude of the N1 for targets in the unattended portion of the attended object was larger than the amplitude of the N1 for targets at an equivalent distance from the locus of attention but on an unattended object. These results provide evidence that while spatial attention does serve as a selection mechanism for further processing, spatial attention can spread across objects and influences further perceptual processing.

Emotional stimuli

More recently, research on the N1 has expanded into the processing of socially relevant stimuli. Attention is especially relevant to the processing of emotional stimuli because emotional stimuli (vs. unemotional stimuli) are believed to receive preferential attention and perceptual processing. ERP research has been useful in understanding how emotion relates to attention because the N1 provides a means of examining the significance of emotion in capturing attentional resources. Several studies, using a variety of paradigms, have found that emotional stimuli are influential in capturing attention. For example, in one study, both stimuli that were positively valenced (e.g., nude person of the opposite sex) and negatively valenced (e.g., snarling wolf) were shown to elicit greater N1 amplitudes than neutrally valenced (e.g., wrist watch) stimuli. Similarly, the valence of interpersonal stimuli has been found to influence the amplitude of the N1. Positive stimuli (e.g., smiling faces) and negative stimuli (e.g., sad faces) have been found to elicit a greater N1 than neutral stimuli (e.g., neutral faces). These findings support the claim that emotional stimuli are more effective in capturing attentional resources than non-emotional stimuli.

== What the N1 has revealed about attentional processes ==
The large corpus of studies focused on factors that modulate the amplitude of the visual N1 have provided a wealth of evidence suggesting that, while the visual N1 is a sensory component evoked by any visual stimulus, it also reflects a benefit of correctly allocating attentional resources and that it is a manifestation of an important sensory gating mechanism of attention. When attention is focused on areas of the visual field in which relevant information is presented (vs. evenly distributed across the visual field or focused on an area in which relevant information is not presented), the amplitude of the N1 is largest and indicates a benefit of correctly allocating attentional resources. Additionally, the amplitude of the N1 is believed to represent a sensory gain control mechanism because focusing attention on one area of the visual field serves to increase the amplitude of the N1 to relevant perceptual information presented in that field (vs. the other visual field), and thus facilitates further perceptual processing of stimuli. This finding supports the Early Selection Model of Attention, which contends that attention acts (i.e., filters information) on a stimulus set early in the information processing stream.

Additionally, research on the visual N1 suggests that spatial and object attention serve as an early selection mechanism that influences the selection of other perceptual features (e.g., color, motion) for further processing. The amplitude of the N1 is largest for perceptual features in attended (vs. unattended) locations and on attended (vs. unattended) objects, providing evidence that perceptual features are only selected for further perceptual processing if they are in attended locations or on attended objects.

Lastly, the visual N1 has also been interpreted to reflect a discrimination process that takes place within the locus of attention. As compared with conditions that simply require a response, the N1 component is enhanced in conditions that require a differentiation between classes of stimuli. This effect is similar for color- and form-based discriminations, regardless of the level of difficulty of the discrimination. The N1 may, therefore, reflect a discrimination mechanism that is applied to an attended spatial area.

== Neural sources ==
Identifying the neurological sources of ERP components based on the topographical distribution of the N1 on the scalp is especially difficult because the number of potential sources (referred to as dipoles), orientations, and magnitudes that can produce the topographical distribution of the N1, like any other ERP component, is theoretically infinite. This problem of working from the topographical distribution of ERP components to identifying neural sources, is referred to as the Inverse problem. Although the neural generators of the N1 are not definitively known, evidence suggests that the N1 does not originate in the primary visual cortex, but instead from multiple generators in the occipito-parietal, occipito-temporal, and (possibly) frontal cortex.

== See also ==
- Bereitschaftspotential
- Contingent negative variation
- Difference due to memory
- Early left anterior negativity
- Electroencephalography
- Electroretinography
- Error-related negativity
- Event-related brain potential components:
  - C1 and P1, P200, P300, P3a, P3b, P600
  - N100, N200, N2pc, N170, N400
- Event-related potential
- Evoked field
- Evoked potential
- International Society for Clinical Electrophysiology of Vision
- Late positive component
- Lateralized readiness potential
- Mismatch negativity
- Mismatch negativity
- Neural oscillation
- Somatosensory evoked potential
