= N200 (neuroscience) =

The N200, or N2, is an event-related potential (ERP) component. An ERP can be monitored using a non-invasive electroencephalography (EEG) cap that is fitted over the scalp on human subjects. An EEG cap allows researchers and clinicians to monitor the minute electrical activity that reaches the surface of the scalp from post-synaptic potentials in neurons, which fluctuate in relation to cognitive processing. EEG provides millisecond-level temporal resolution and is therefore known as one of the most direct measures of covert mental operations in the brain. The N200 in particular is a negative-going wave that peaks 200-350ms post-stimulus and is found primarily over anterior scalp sites. Past research focused on the N200 as a mismatch detector, but it has also been found to reflect executive cognitive control functions, and has recently been used in the study of language (Folstein & Van Petten, 2008; Schmitt, Münte, & Kutas, 2000).

== History ==
The N2 component starts with the discovery of EEG which dates back as early as 1929 with Hans Berger demonstrating the ability to record electrical activity of the brain by simply placing electrodes over the scalp and then amplifying the signal. Later, in 1936, researcher Pauline and Hallowell Davis manipulated events in the environment and recorded the first known ERP's. One of the first experiments to find evidence of an N200 was by Sutton, Braren, Zubin, and John (1965) when examining the effects of stimulus uncertainty on sensory potentials. In their study, participants were presented with two types of paired stimuli. In the certain condition, a cue stimulus was presented that was predictive of the modality of the target stimulus, which was either clicks or light flashes. In the uncertain condition, the cue stimulus was not predictive and could be followed by either a click or a light flash. The researchers occasionally found a negativity that peaked on average 190ms post-stimulus in the uncertain condition (N200), in addition to a positivity 300ms post-stimulus (P300).

Following the experiment by Sutton et al. (1965), subsequent research further manipulated stimulus uncertainty in an attempt to elicit a more robust N200. The N200 has been found in a variety of different experimental conditions, and is now thought to consist of several subcomponents. The N200 in response to attended or unattended deviant auditory stimuli, similar to what was originally seen in Sutton et al. (1965), is referred to as the mismatch negativity. Additionally, there is the no-go N200, which is elicited on no-go trials in go/no-go tasks. More generally, the N2 component has been described in tasks that reflect stimulus identification, attentional shifts, inhibition of motor responses, overcoming stereotypical responses or conflict monitoring, maintenance of context information, response selection timing, and detection of novelty or mismatch.

== Main paradigms ==
The N200 is seen in a variety of experimental paradigms. A commonly used experimental design is the Eriksen flanker task. In this task, participants are shown an array of items (usually letters), with each letter corresponding to a left or right-handed response. For example, the letter 'A' could indicate a left-handed response, and the letter 'B' a right-handed response. It is the job of the participants to respond to the central item of the array, which is flanked by the same item on compatible trials (AAAAA) or a different item on incompatible trials (BBABB). The N200 is normally seen on incompatible trials.

Another task that has been utilized to elicit a N200 is the go/no-go task. This task presents participants with two different stimuli that indicate which hand to respond with (e.g. 'A' indicates a left-handed response and 'B' a right-handed response). The stimuli also vary on another dimension that indicates whether a response is necessary (e.g. small letter requires a response, large letter means do not respond). For example, a small 'A' would indicate a left-handed go, and a large 'B' would be a right-handed no-go. The go/no-go mapping is then reversed to test for differences (e.g. letter size would indicate the hand and letter identity the go/no-go). The N200 is most often seen on no-go trials.

=== In the study of language ===
Since the go/no-go paradigm with N200 can be used to indicate the timing of information noting, it is a good candidate to examine the order of language processing and production. Schmitt et al. (2000) utilized the occurrence of N200 in the go/no-go paradigm to determine the timing of semantic and phonological information processing. Participants were presented with a series of pictures. In one trial instance, the participant was asked to respond (by pressing a button) or not to make a respond based on the semantic feature of the picture - whether the picture depicted an animal or a non-animal object; in the paralleled instance, the participant made a response or no response based upon whether the name of the pictured item began with a vowel or consonant (phonology-dependent). EEG of the participants were analyzed, and the researchers found that the peak latency of the N200 occurred earlier when the response was contingent on semantic information than on phonological information. Thus, they were able to conclude that semantic information becomes available earlier than phonological information in language processing. Researchers have also been able to show that some forms of knowledge are available from written words as quickly as 160 ms by capitalizing on the go/nogo paradigm associated with N200 to .

== Functional sensitivity ==
The latency, amplitude, and distribution of the N200 are sensitive to several factors depending on the type of experiment. The N200 is often seen as part of a complex of components including the P3a and P3b. The N200 component responds functionally much like the P3b component in that stimulus probability can affect the amplitude of both. This is one reason why the P3 and the N2 are often researched together, since they are both sensitive to similar manipulations and represent a connection of mental mechanisms that work together to interpret the changing environment.

In the Eriksen flanker task and go/no-go paradigm, the peak amplitude of the N200 increases for incompatible and for no-go trials respectively. This increase in amplitude has been hypothesized as the mental need to control incorrect response preparation. Latency is correlated with response time in the flanker task. Although the N200 is primarily distributed over anterior brain regions, posterior distributions have been reported in visual attention paradigms, such as visual search.

During a stop signal task the frontocentral N2 is sensitive to time pressure, in that when individuals are asked to respond as quickly as possible the amplitude of the N2 increases. This increase in amplitude is larger within individuals who have what is considered a fast stop signal reaction time and thus who are able to inhibit a prepotent response very quickly. The N2 amplitude is also reduced over right frontal electrodes sites in ADHD children. The N2 latency during the stop signal task is longer in unsuccessful than successful trials suggesting that the mental process is taking too long to evaluate the stop signal and therefore not fully processing the signal enough to inhibit a motor response.

== Component characteristics ==
The N2 ERP component can be further divided into three different sub-components: N2a or auditory MMN, N2b, and N2c. Please refer to the outline table below for each sub-component and the outlined differences and similarities.

Component	N2a or Auditory MMN	N2b	N2c
General Location:	Frontocentral/Anterior	Frontocentral/Anterior	Posterior
Co-component:	----	Observed along with frontal P3a component	Observed along with P3b component
Attention:	Attention not required in repetitive stimulus presentation	Requires conscious stimulus attention	Requires conscious stimulus attention
Scalp Distribution:	Anterior scalp distribution for auditory stimuli.	Central scalp distribution for auditory and visual stimuli.	Posterior scalp distribution for visual stimuli. Frontal-central distribution for auditory stimuli
Neural Generator:	Auditory cortical region, frontal lobe, and possibly hippocampus.	Anterior cingulated cortex, frontal and superior temporal cortex.	----
Paradigms:	Auditory Oddball and Go-Nogo with no behavior response.	Oddball, Flanker, Go-Nogo, Stop Signal.	Oddball, Flanker, Go-Nogo, Stop Signal.
Latency:	Increase latency with increase in non-targets. Related to auditory processing duration.	Latency related to timing of mental access to properties of a stimulus.	Latency related to reaction time.
Amplitude:	Related to sensory auditory memory traces.	Larger for non-targets with no behavioral response. Sometimes called the 'no-go N2'.	Larger for targets. Much more prominent than N2b.
Probability:	----	Increase in amplitude when no-go trials with the non-targets are less probable or equal with largest effect at Fz.	Decreased in amplitude in trials with the high probable targets with largest effect at sites Fz and Cz.
Cognitive Representation:	Responsible for detection of novelty or mismatch to the attended stimuli. Believed to reflect disparity between the deviating stimulus and a sensory-memory representation of the standard stimulus. Analyze the characterization of auditory stimulus features in sensory memory. Automatic novelty sensing process.	Related to response inhibition, response conflict, and error monitoring. Sensitive to detection of perceptual novelty or attentional deviation. Overriding a prepotent response system. Deviation from a mentally-stored expectation of the standard stimulus.	Represents visual attention or degree of attention that is needed for processing of stimuli context and features within the visual cortex of the brain.

== Theory/sources ==
In go/no-go tasks, no-go trials require inhibition of a response when information indicating response hand is processed before the go/no-go information. Presence of an N200 on no-go trials suggests that the N200 reflects a cognitive control function, specifically an inhibitory response control mechanism.

However, the theory of the N200 as a response-inhibition mechanism has been debated by Donkers and van Boxtel (2004). They compared ERP recordings from a go/no-go task to a go/GO task, where the GO was a more forceful response to the go task. This experimental set-up allowed them to compare the no-go task, where some responses are inhibited and compete with one another, with the GO task, where responses just compete. Evidence of a N200 was present in both the no-go and GO task, so the researchers reasoned that the N200 does not represent response-inhibition, but rather conflict monitoring. However, it is still clear that the N200 represents some cognitive control function.

== See also ==
- Bereitschaftspotential
- C1 and P1
- Contingent negative variation
- Difference due to memory
- Early left anterior negativity
- Error-related negativity
- Late positive component
- Lateralized readiness potential
- Mismatch negativity
- N2pc
- N100
- N170
- N400
- P3a
- P3b
- P200
- P300 (neuroscience)
- P600
- Somatosensory evoked potential
- Visual N1
