= Lateralized readiness potential =

In neuroscience, the lateralized readiness potential (LRP) is an event-related brain potential, or increase in electrical activity at the surface of the brain, that is thought to reflect the preparation of motor activity on a certain side of the body; in other words, it is a spike in the electrical activity of the brain that happens when a person gets ready to move one arm, leg, or foot. It is a special form of bereitschaftspotential (a general pre-motor potential). LRPs are recorded using electroencephalography (EEG) and have numerous applications in cognitive neuroscience.

== History ==
Kornhuber and Deecke's discovery of the Bereitschaftspotential (German for readiness potential) led to research on the now extensively used LRP, which has often been investigated in the context of the mental chronometry paradigm. In the basic chronometric paradigm, the subject experiences a warning stimulus, followed by an interval (foreperiod), and then an imperative stimulus that the subject must respond to (see chronometric paradigm). During this foreperiod, the subject may be able to prepare a unimanual response, based on information from the warning stimulus. Part of this preparation includes a slow negative wave bilaterally distributed over pre- and post-central sites, the readiness potential. Vaughan, Costa, and Ritter (1968) noted that the readiness potential was larger contralateral to the side of the body where the muscle contraction occurred. The only RPs that do not seem to be lateralized are face and tongue movements which have symmetrical distribution over both hemispheres with the maximum of the potential located in the lower half of the central sulcus. That the lateralized aspect of the readiness potential in general might be used to measure the amount of motor preparation for a direct specific action, termed "corrected motor asymmetry", was highlighted by De Jong and Gratton et al.

== Present-day methodology ==
The LRP is elicited whenever a subject initiates a voluntary movement with his/her hand (or feet). Typically, a subject may be given a task requiring a button press (or squeeze) response. The LRP is recorded from the ERP over part of the motor cortex associated with the body part used to initiate the movement.

The LRP is classically studied in response cuing paradigms (see cueing paradigm) and calculated by subtracting potentials recorded over the left and right side of the scalp in the motor cortex (Coles 1988). For example, if a subject were to move his or her left hand, the subsequent event related potential would be recorded over two scalp sites with the larger negativity over motor cortex on the right side of the scalp (C4) and the smaller potential over the left side of the scalp (C3). This voltage for the C3 is subtracted from C4 to yield a value that is then averaged over the course of all the subjects responses for left hand movement. The exact same procedure occurs for deriving right hand movement. The averaged potential is the LRP. The larger negativity (excluding face and tongue movements) is seen contralateral to the moving body part for all movements except foot movements which display a paradoxical ERP on the scalp (larger negativity is ipsilateral to moving body part).

LRPs may be stimulus-locked, meaning they are measured with respect to the moment the eliciting stimulus appeared, or response-locked, meaning they are measured with respect to the moment the subject performed the actual motor activity (as measured by the execution of the movement or by recording muscle activity in the effector). These two different kinds of analyses may reveal different kinds of effects.

If something in the experiment affects the amount of time it takes before the subject is able to make a decision about their response (for example, darkening the screen so it takes the subject longer to perceive the stimulus in the first place), a stimulus-locked analysis can show that the LRP itself starts later in that condition, but takes the same amount of time to "build up" to the real motor response. On the other hand, if the experiment does not change this sort of "premotor" processing but does affect the amount of time the motor process itself takes, a response-locked analysis can reveal that the LRP starts further ahead of the response and takes longer to build up.

== Main paradigms with examples of applications in cognitive psychology ==
The LRP is a non-invasive brain measure that describes when someone starts preparing a motor response with either their right or left hand (note the measure would work for feet too, but it is most often applied for hand movements). That means it can be used to access whether the brain is simulating an action even when the action is never carried out and even if the participant is unaware of the ongoing simulation. This makes the LRP a powerful tool for investigating various questions in cognitive psychology.

There are three general types of inferences that the LRP can generate, including (1) whether a response has been preferentially activated, (2) the degree to which a response has been preferentially activated, and (3) when a response is preferentially activated. Experimental paradigms that interface nicely with these questions include cueing paradigms, the Go/No-Go paradigm and paradigms that induce conflict in the response system. Generally, cueing paradigms can be used to study factors that influence response preparation, the Go/No-Go paradigm is useful for asking questions about the temporal order of information processing, and conflict paradigms help answer questions about the types of information that reach the response system from other brain systems. Outside of these paradigms, studies have also used the LRP component to characterize the contribution of response processes in various cognitive processes and in characterizing individual differences in behavior. Below is a review of some examples from these general categories of LRP applications, from a range of cognitive disciplines.

=== Cueing paradigms for studying factors that influence response preparation ===
In a basic cuing paradigm, for an LRP to occur there must be a cue presented that predicts a meaningful stimulus is about to be presented, to which the subject will have to respond. This creates a foreperiod when their response or some instructed behavior is contingent on some event they've just been warned will happen. The cue that predicts a future stimulus is usually called the warning stimulus, or cue, and the future stimulus to respond to is usually called the imperative stimulus, or target. Importantly, for the LRP to occur the imperative stimulus must be a cue that indicates which hand the subject should prepare to respond with, so that a period of response preparation occurs. For example, if a cue indicates a 50% chance of responding with the right or left hand, then no LRP is likely to occur. The amplitude of the lateralization effect is thought to represent the amount of differential response preparation elicited by the warning stimulus. The amplitude of the LRP also indicates how close one is to the response threshold—the point in the LRP just before response initiation occurs.

Cueing paradigms may even influence response preparation when the subject is unaware of the cue. In a special type of cuing paradigm the cue can be presented for a very short period of time (e.g., 40 ms) and preceded and followed by other visual stimuli that effectively "mask" the cue's presence. This type of paradigm, called "masked priming", has been used with the LRP to see whether a cue someone is unable to identify at all is still able to influence the response system. For example, one study showed that a masked prime that gave conflicting response information compared to the target reliably slowed subjects’ response times, even though the subjects reported never seeing the masked prime. They also showed that the conflicting masked prime induced an LRP such that the brain started preparing a response based on the semantic information in the masked prime. This suggests that a cue with newly learned meaningful implications for the motor system (i.e., arbitrary response-mappings) need not be consciously processed in order for response preparations to begin. Thus since the LRP can pick up signals for responses never actually initiated or perceived of, it can uncover information processing that happens without our awareness but that can still affect our overt behavior.

=== Go/No-Go paradigms for studying temporal order of information processing ===
In a Go/No-Go paradigm participants are told to respond with their right or left hand according to a specific feature of a presented target. For example, subjects may be instructed to respond with their right hand if the target letter is red and with their left hand if the target letter is yellow. For the No-Go part, subjects are told to only respond to the hand-referenced feature based on some other feature of the target. For example, they may be instructed to not respond if the letter is a vowel. Trials consistent with instructions to respond are "Go" trials, and trials consistent with instructions to not respond are "No-Go" trials.

This paradigm helps answer questions about the order of information extraction by through comparison of LRPs (or lack of) to stimulus features in the Go versus No-Go conditions. Specifically, an LRP on No-Go trials would signify that whatever feature was driving hand selection was processed sometime before processing of the feature that indicated no response was necessary. To verify the order of information extraction it is important to flip the features that are mapped to hand selection and the No-Go instruction. If no LRP occurs in either condition of response and No-Go feature mapping, this suggests the stimulus features may be processed in parallel or at approximately the same time. Like the cueing paradigms, the LRP in the Go/No-Go paradigm can also occur at different time points and vary in magnitude, which gives additional information about the timing of information processing and the magnitude of differential order of processing.

For example, one study used the LRP component to characterize the temporal order with which grammatical and phonological information about a word is retrieved when preparing to speak. Like described above, the experiment used a Go/No-Go paradigm, such that grammatical and phonological features of a depicted word to be vocalized were mapped to either the "Go" response or the "No-Go" response instruction. The grammatical feature was the grammatical gender of the depicted noun; the phonological feature was phoneme that the noun label started with. Using the characteristic nature of the LRP, they showed that a response was prepared for grammatical features even when the phonological features of the word meant no response was necessary. Importantly, no LRP was evident on No-Go trials when grammatical gender determined whether a response was necessary and phonology determined response hand, suggesting that grammatical information is indeed retrieved before phonological information. Similarly, another study used the LRP in a Go/No-Go paradigm to show that conceptual information about nouns (e.g., is the depicted item heavier or lighter than 500g?) is retrieved approximately 80 ms before grammatical information. These and other studies have been seen as support for a serial model of speech production in which conceptual information about a word is retrieved first, followed by grammatical information and then by phonological information. However, more recent research using the Go/No-Go paradigm has challenged this model, showing that the relative order with which lexical features are retrieved may be modulated by attentional biases, and that retrieval difficulty can selectively delay the retrieval of semantic information without impacting the timing of phonological retrieval. Together, these studies show how the LRP has helped to map out the temporal dynamics of information processing during speech production.

Other studies have used the LRP in the Go/No-Go paradigm to study the temporal nature of information recalled about a person upon seeing their face. Think about when you see someone you know in the hallway, and immediately your brain starts to conjure up facts related to the person like their name or memories like their hobbies, their job, or what their personality is like. Studies have typically shown putting a name to a face is harder than remembering biographical memories about someone. Using the LRP, studies have tried to do precise mapping of different factors that affect the order of access to different types of information about someone, just by seeing their face.

=== Conflict paradigms for studying transmission of partial information ===
As described above, experiments have used the LRP to generate support for a continuous model of stimulus evaluation and response selection. This model predicts that partial information is continuously available from the environment and information can accumulate to an eventual response or near response that is never actually committed. This is in contrast to a discrete model that predicts full stimulus evaluation must be complete before response initiation can start. Thus results using the LRP suggest that partial information is accumulated in the sensory systems and is sent to the motor system before and during response preparation (Coles et al., 1988).

One classic cognitive "conflict" paradigm that illustrates these findings is the Eriksen flanker task. In this experiment participants must respond to a central target that is surrounded by distractors that either represent a response consistent with the target or a response inconsistent with the target (rather is consistent with the contralateral hand response). If partial information transmission occurs, then on trials where the target is surrounded by response-inconsistent distractors, there should be an LRP indicating response preparation to the incorrect hand even when the eventual response was correct, and there should be no LRP to the same target when response-consistent distractors surrounded it and the correct response was given. This pattern of results is traditionally shown. Importantly, the effect holds regardless of the response mappings (across hands).

The flankers task requires blocking out irrelevant distractors from the environment, but what if the relevant and irrelevant features are embedded in one target stimulus? This is often the case in the classic Stroop task, such as when one must inhibit their natural response to read a word by responding to only the ink color that the word is printed in. This requires focusing on the task-relevant features of a given stimulus while ignoring task-irrelevant features of the same stimulus. Is information about both features processed simultaneously? The LRP has been used to investigate transmission of partial information in this context. A nice example is in a paper co-authored by one of the first to discover the LRP, Dr. Gabriele Gratton. In this study, the subject performs a spatial stroop task, where they are cued to respond to an upcoming word that is either the word "ABOVE" or the word "BELOW" presented physically either above or below a central fixation cross. Subjects were cued (in random order) to respond to either the physical position of the word or to the conceptual meaning of the word. Responses are typically slower and less accurate when word position and meaning are inconsistent. For all conditions, the left and right hand button responses corresponded to the two response options. The research question was whether during the spatial stroop task conflict on position-inconsistent (or, incongruent) trials is represented in the motor response stage as can be indexed by the LRP. If an LRP was evident for incongruent trials, this suggests information about the irrelevant stimulus feature was processed at the response stage even on correct trials and this generated response conflict, again supporting a model of continuous information processing. Indeed, the results supported this hypothesis. The study also collected event-related optical signal (EROS) data, which has a spatial resolution for imaging cortical activity in-vivo that is somewhat more coarse than functional magnetic resonance imaging, but has a temporal precision similar to event-related potentials (ERPs). Using EROS they showed that at least one source of the LRP was the motor cortex ipsilateral to the response hand, supporting response conflict in the primary motor cortex as one source of conflict in the stroop task.

== Other uses ==
=== Assessing the contribution of response-system effects in cognitive processes ===
The study by DeSoto et al., 2001 is a nice example of not only demonstrating support for a continuous model of information processing, but also of using the LRP to characterize the contribution of response-based conflict in a cognitive process. This is also a type of application the LRP is useful for in cognitive psychology.

=== Clinical applications with the LRP ===
The LRP can also be used to characterize individual differences in aspects of information processing as described above. One example of this has been the use of the LRP to study cognitive aging.

For instance, the LRP has been used to specify whether age-associated slowed processing originates in motor or higher-level cognitive processes, or both. Yordanova et al., 2004 showed by using LRPs that stimulus processing and response selection were not affected by age. Rather there was slowing in response execution for older adults when there was increased response complexity (four response mappings) compared to simple stimulus-response mapping (one response mapping). In a follow-up study by the same group Kolev et al., 2006 used the LRP again to show that the effects from their 2004 study generalized to the auditory domain, and to extend further support that the effects of aging on slowed response time in a four choice reaction time task is in the response generation and execution stage and not in stimulus processing and selection.

== General summary of functional sensitivity ==
Based on the classic studies outlining the LRP and some more recent applications of studying cognitive psychology with the LRP, what is the LRP functionally sensitive to? What modulates its amplitude and latency, and what is that inferred to mean?

Generally, the amplitude of the lateralization effect is thought to represent the amount of differential response preparation elicited by the cue or warning stimulus. For example, in cuing paradigms where the subject is given valid cues to the hand that should be used for the upcoming response, accuracy and reaction time are faster, and preparation of the correct hand, as measured by the LRP, can be seen in response to the cue. Indeed, the presence of an LRP following a neutral cue (one that provides no information about hand) can be used to determine whether or not subjects are guessing.

The amplitude of the LRP also indicates how close one is to the response threshold—the point in the LRP that predicts response initiation. In an experiment by Gratton, Coles, Sirevaag, Erikson, and Donchin in 1988, the time of response initiation, defined as the latency of onset of EMG activity, was examined in relation to the LRP. It was found that the timing of response initiation was consistently associated with a particular LRP voltage, which can then be thought of as the response threshold. When subjects are instructed to then inhibit an overt response, there is a decrease in the magnitude as well as a delay in the latency of the LRP for successful inhibitions. However, on partial inhibitions, the LRP still reaches the response threshold, even when the overt response is successfully inhibited, showing that the "point of no return" occurs after the LRP.

Based on the work of Osman and colleagues we also know that in the Go/No-Go paradigm, feature discriminability (e.g., discriminate between V and 5, easy) or between l and 1 (lowercase l and the number 1, difficult) affects onset of the LRP difference between the "Go" and "No-Go" (response execution), but not LRP onset (response preparation). In contrast, they've shown that stimulus-response compatibility affects LRP onset (response preparation) but does not affect the onset of the difference waves (response execution). More generally, the distinction between response preparation and execution can refer to the time before and after the onset of the LRP such that the time between seeing the stimulus and the onset of the stimulus-locked LRP reflects response preparation processes and the time between onset of the stimulus-locked LRP and the behavioral response reflects response execution processes. Overall, studies have shown that stimulus quality and stimulus compatibility affect response preparation processes, whereas factors related to response complexity tend to delay response execution processes.

Later studies on event preparation examining the foreperiod of the contingent negative variation (CNV), which orients the subject to respond to warned stimuli, and the foreperiod of the LRP were used to study the exact mechanism of event preparation. In their paper on inferences from CNV and LRP they cited experiments done by Ulrich, Moore, & Osman (1993) in which three hypotheses could be derived. The abstract motor preparation hypothesis states that only the response hand that has been selected is prepared but nothing else. The muscle-unspecific preparation hypothesis suggests that muscles are cued at the same time when the limb side is not specified. The muscle-specific preparation hypothesis states that the muscle and limb are prepared when direction and limb side are specified. The muscle-specific preparation hypothesis gained the most support with follow up studies (Ulrich, Leuthold, & Sommer, 1998). Leuthold et al. suggest that the motor processes be divided up into early (motor-unspecific preparation hypothesis) and late (motor-specific hypothesis). Studies done by Sangals, Sommer, and Leuthold (2002) and Leuthold et al. (1996) conclude that LRP is largely affected by precuing effects. They demonstrate that the more the subject knows about the direction and which hand to move, for example, the larger the foreperiod of the LRP even in conditions that stress time and pressure.

== See also ==
- Bereitschaftspotential
- C1 and P1
- Difference due to memory
- Early left anterior negativity
- Error-related negativity
- Late positive component
- Mismatch negativity
- N100
- N200
- N2pc
- N170
- Neuroscience of free will
- N400
- P200
- P300 (neuroscience)
- P3a
- P3b
- P600
- Somatosensory evoked potential
- Visual N1
