= C1 and P1 =

The C1 and P1 (also called the P100) are two human scalp-recorded event-related brain potential (event-related potential (ERP)) components, collected by means of a technique called electroencephalography (EEG). The C1 is named so because it was the first component in a series of components found to respond to visual stimuli when it was first discovered. It can be a negative-going component (when using a mastoid reference point) or a positive going component with its peak normally observed in the 65–90 ms range post-stimulus onset. The P1 is called the P1 because it is the first positive-going component (when also using a mastoid reference point) and its peak is normally observed in around 100 ms. Both components are related to processing of visual stimuli and are under the category of potentials called visually evoked potentials (VEPs). Both components are theorized to be evoked within the visual cortices of the brain with C1 being linked to the primary visual cortex (striate cortex) of the human brain and the P1 being linked to other visual areas (Extrastriate cortex). One of the primary distinctions between these two components is that, whereas the P1 can be modulated by attention, the C1 has been typically found to be invariable to different levels of attention.

== History ==
The different components within the category of VEPs were first described by Spehlmann in 1965, who compared human ERPs when viewing patterned and diffuse stimuli that were quickly flashed on the screen while a person was viewing the general area where the flash was to appear. However, it was not until Jeffreys and Axford that the earliest individual components of those VEPs were delineated, including the C1 component. They had human participants view stimulus patterns of squares for a very short time (25ms), aperiodically, in different parts of the participant's visual fields while being recorded using electrodes placed towards the back of the head. Specifically, they recorded from three electrode sites placed on the longitudinal midline of the head: one 3 cm anterior to the inion (the bony projection at the posteroinferior part of the skull), and two 3 cm to either side of the midline. After averaging between like trials (trials where the stimuli were presented in the same part of the visual field) and looking at the ERPs, Jeffreys and Axford postulated that there are two distinct components in the first 150 milliseconds, the C1 and the C2. But of the two components, the C1 tended to show polarity shifts across the scalp for trials where a stimulus was shown on one side of the visual field was compared to trials where stimuli were shown on the opposite side of the visual field. The C1's polarity is also inverted whenever trials where the stimuli were presented in the top half of the visual field versus when stimuli were presented in the lower half of the visual field. Based on this evidence, Jeffreys and Axford proposed that the C1 reflected activity in the striate cortex as the activity tends to reflect a retinotopic map very similar to the one in the striate cortex.

Since its initial discovery, the common theory about the C1 continues to state that it is an early component when viewing stimuli and that it represents activity in the primary visual cortex.

One of the initial descriptions of the P1 can be credited to Spehlmann with his categorization of components within the VEPs. Whereas previous papers had looked at human ERPs to visual stimuli, and, undoubtedly, recorded P1 components as can be seen by visually inspecting the waveforms in the early articles, Spehlmann was one of the first to describe a "surface positive component at 80-120ms." In his experiment, Spehlmann showed participants patterns of black and white squares, arranged in a checkerboard manner. These patterns were flashed to the participant by using a strobe light that had a frequency of 1-2 flashes per second. Averaging across trials, Spehlmann noted two different positivities, the first of which would later go on to be known as the P1.

In the last quarter of the 20th century, the P1 started to be studied looking at what is called the P1 "effect" in the selective attention domain. Van Voorhis and Hillyard found modulations in the P1 due to attention using the famous paradigm used by Eason, Harter, and White. For their experiment, Van Voorhis and Hillyard had participants view circular flashes of light to the left and to the right of a central fixation with the right and left flashes occurring independently with each side having flashes 2 to 8 seconds apart (a replication of Eason et al.), the flashes occurring randomly with 1 to 4 seconds between each flash (left or right), or the flashes occurring randomly with 300 to 600ms between each flash. Participants were instructed to either attend to the left visual field, the right visual hemisphere, or both visual hemispheres for a double flash (two flashes within 70ms of each other). Participants were also instructed to either look for the target passively or press a button whenever the double flash occurs. To record the ERPs, they had two electrodes down the midline (Cz and Oz) all referenced to the right mastoid. Van Voorhis and Hillyard found that the P1 had a greater positive amplitude when the target was presented in the attended field than when it was presented outside the attended field across all conditions. This was one of the first papers to show that attention could modulate a visually evoked potential as early on as the P1. Ever since this experiment, the difference between the P1 amplitude when the participant is attending in the correct and incorrect visual field (or the P1 effect) has been extensively studied as part of selective attention.

== Component characteristics ==
The C1 component typically peaks anywhere from 50–100ms and its polarity and scalp distribution are dependent on where the stimulus is presented. Roughly speaking, the C1 has a negative polarity if the stimuli is presented in the upper half of the visual field (when using a mastoid reference) but it has a positive polarity if the stimuli is presented in the lower half of the visual field. The C1 scalp distribution is fairly broad with greatest polarity typically along the occipito-parietal sites, although the scalp can be lateralized with greater polarity along the occipito-parietal sites contralateral to the stimulus.

The P1 component is a positive going component that typically begins around 70–90ms with a peak around 80-130ms. Its amplitude maximum is over the lateral occipital scalp, approximately right over the ventrolateral prestriate cortex, contralateral to the visual field in which the stimuli is presented.

== Main paradigms ==
C1s are evoked whenever a visual stimulus is presented. As such, virtually any paradigm that presents visual stimuli can be used to look at the C1 component. However, one of the main paradigms used to look at the differential effects of viewing stimuli in different visual fields, and the one used to originally identify the C1 component, involves presenting visual stimuli in all different visual hemifields, one at a time. The participant is typically warned that a series of stimuli are to be presented and then exactly the same type of stimuli are presented all while participants fixate at a cross at the center of the screen.

Early P1 research centered on looking at what components are present when visual stimuli was viewed. This is reflected by the main paradigm used to elicit a P1. In this paradigm, geometric objects, patterns of geometric shapes, colors, or even just flashes of white light, for a very short time. ERPs are then recorded from sites above occipital regions and those waveforms are averaged across trials.

Later research on the P1 started to look at the P1 effect with regards to selective attention. These paradigms vary with type of stimuli used and time in between stimuli but the base paradigm mainly involved the participant attending to a specific part of the visual field while looking for a target in his or her entire visual field. Blocks of stimuli are presented one at a time and the participant must indicate (or at the very least look for) the target stimuli's presence. Before each block specific instructions are given as to what part of the visual field to attend to as well as any experiment specific instructions. The important comparison is between the P1 for targets that are presented in the space where a participant was attending versus targets that appear in parts of the visual field where the participants were not attending.

A variant of this paradigm is the filter paradigm. In this paradigm participants are asked to attend to a certain part of the visual field and to not pay attention to or "filter out" the rest of the visual field. Blocks of stimuli are presented one at a time in both attended and unattended space. Participants are to look for a target that differs from the rest of the stimuli on some number of dimensions such as size, length, luminance, etc. within only the attended space as indicated before every block. However, targets are also presented in the unattended space. The important comparison in this paradigm is between the P1 for targets presented within the attended visual field versus targets that were presented out of the attended visual field.

Another variant of the basic paradigm of selective attention is the visuospatial cueing paradigm. In this paradigm stimuli are presented one at a time in a fixed number of locations in the visual field. Participants are to look for and indicate if a particular stimulus is the target stimulus. The main aspect of this paradigm is that prior to every presentation of a stimulus there is a cue, indicating where the stimulus is going to be present. The cues, though, are not entirely accurate with some percentage indicating the wrong spatial location. In some experiments there could even be cues that do not indicate any specific location whatsoever or a neutral cue. The critical comparison in this paradigm is the comparison between the P1 on trials where the stimulus was presented in the location indicated by the cue versus trials when the stimulus was presented in a location not indicated by the cue. For those experiments where a neutral cue is given, another important comparison is between the P1 of the two trials where a directional cue is given (either correct or incorrect) versus the P1 on those trials where the cue gives no indication of a direction.

== Functional sensitivity ==
=== Spatial location in the visual field ===
The C1 component is sensitive to where a stimulus is presented in a visual field. The C1 has been shown to be negative when items are presented in the top half of the visual field and positive when the visual stimuli are presented in the bottom half of the visual field. The scalp distribution of the C1 component can also lateralized based on the lateralization of the stimuli. Stimuli presented in the left half of the visual field will elicit more negativity over the rightward occipital and parietal channels. Stimuli presented in the right half of the visual field will elicit a negativity over the leftward occipital and parietal channels.

While the polarity is consistent across presentations of visual stimuli in different visual fields, the P1s scalp topographic maps do change in that the positivity is elicited contralaterally to the visual field in which a stimulus is presented although not to the extent shown in the C1 component.

=== Attention ===
One of the main differences between the C1 and the P1 is the effects of attention on each component. Although multiple studies have shown that there is no effect of increased attention on the C1, more recent studies suggest that C1 may be more sensitive to internal states than previously thought. However studies using different variants of spatial cueing paradigms have shown that the P1 shows greater amplitude when a stimulus is shown in an area where the participant was attending. In an experiment by Mangun and Hillyard, they had had participants do a size discrimination task between two bars, one on the left and one on the right with the target stimuli either being the smaller or taller bars, depending on the block of trials. A cue was given before each pair of blocks was given. This cue was only correct 75% of the time. When comparing the P1 when the participant was attending to the correct side to the P1 when the participant was not attending to the correct side, the former had a greater amplitude than the latter.

However, the P1 effect is not necessarily modulated by having participants attend to a certain area. By adding a neutral cue, they showed that there was no difference between the amplitude of the P1 when the correct area was attended and when a neutral cue was given, not giving any indication as to where the target stimulus was to show up.

== Theory/source ==
=== P1 reflects the "cost of attention" ===
Luck, Hillyard, Mouloua, Woldorff, Clark and Hawkins proposed that the P1 effect is a reflection of a "cost of attention." As has been shown previously, whenever a participant is paying attention to a particular area and the target stimulus was presented outside wherever the participant was attending, there is a decrement in the P1 amplitude. Luck et al. claim that this decrement is actually a cost of attending someplace and being incorrect. This decrement or suppression of the P1 represents the cost of having to stop attending to one area and shift the attention to the place where the target stimulus is located. This is as compared to another component called the N1. The N1 shows an increment in amplitude when a participant is attending to a certain area and the stimulus is shown in that area. Luck et al. call this the "benefit" of attention.

=== Early vs. late selection attention models ===
One of the critical debates that the C1 and P1 have helped to contribute to is that of early versus late selection models. Early selection models such as Broadbent's early filter theory claim that attention filter out unattended information while in the middle of processing that information. However late selection models claim that information is processed to a much later stage and attention serves to choose between that processed information. Attentional effects on the P1 show that attention can affect visual processing as early as 65ms with stimuli appearing in unattended regions of space, having a lower P1 amplitude. However, the lack of modulation of the C1 component due to attention or lack thereof shows that not all information is being filtered out immediately. Instead, early aspects of visual processing (as reflected in the C1) seem to unfold in a manner that is unaffected by the allocation of attention over space.

=== C1 and the striate cortex ===
When it was first discovered by Jeffreys and Axford in 1972, they suggested that the source of the C1 component was somewhere in the V1 (or the striate cortex or Brodmann's Area 17) as the polarity reversals and the reversals from side to side mirrored the retinotopic map of V1. More specifically, they suggested that the C1 is generated in Brodmann's Area 17 or the V1. In the early years the findings of some studies helped to support this hypothesis. Conversely, others found that the C1 might be located in areas such as Brodmann's Area 18, or Brodmann's Area 19.

However more recent evidence using source localization techniques such as brain electrical source analysis (BESA) in conjunction with fMRI points to the C1 being generated in the primary visual cortex of Brodmann's area 17. Clark, Fan, and Hillyard using a paradigm whereby circular checkerboards were presented in different visual fields, localized the C1 to the striate cortex using a 2-dipole BESA approach. Di Russo, Martinez, and Hillyard used sinusoidally modulated black and white checkerboard circles in the four different hemifields (upper-right, upper-left, lower-right, and lower-left) to look at the location of the C1. They found also using a BESA method, using 7 pairs of dipoles, that the C1 originated in the striate cortex. Their BESA results also matched up with the concurrent fMRI results for the same participants.

=== The extrastriate cortex ===
The source of P1 component, as opposed to the C1 component, is not entirely known. Work presenting bars in different sections of the visual field, some of which were presented in attended parts of the visual field and some were not, points to the neurological source of the P1 somewhere over the ventrolateral prestriate cortex or Brodmann's Area 18. To make this judgment, they used both current source density maps and structural MRI of the participants to localize the source of the P1. Other papers using a combination of fMRI and BESA dipole modeling have also pointed to the P1 coming from the ventrolateral prestriate cortex.

Further evidence that the P1 is located along the ventral pathway comes from a studies using both ERPs and positron emission tomography. These studies have shown that the P1 is associated with activation in the dorsal occipital areas, and the posterior fusiform gyrus.

== See also ==
- Bereitschaftspotential
- Contingent negative variation
- Difference due to memory
- Early left anterior negativity
- Error-related negativity
- Late positive component
- Lateralized readiness potential
- Mismatch negativity
- N2pc
- N100
- N170
- N200
- N400
- P3a
- P3b
- P200
- P300 (neuroscience)
- P600
- Somatosensory evoked potential
- Visual N1
