= P200 =

In neuroscience, the visual P200 or P2 is a waveform component or feature of the event-related potential (ERP) measured at the human scalp. Like other potential changes measurable from the scalp, this effect is believed to reflect the post-synaptic activity of a specific neural process. The P2 component, also known as the P200, is so named because it is a positive going electrical potential that peaks at about 200 milliseconds (varying between about 150 and 275 ms) after the onset of some external stimulus. This component is often distributed around the centro-frontal and the parieto-occipital areas of the scalp. It is generally found to be maximal around the vertex (frontal region) of the scalp, however there have been some topographical differences noted in ERP studies of the P2 in different experimental conditions.

Research on the visual P2 is at an early stage compared to other more established ERP components and there is much that we still do not know about it. Part of the difficulty of clearly characterizing this component is that it appears to be modulated by a large and diverse number of cognitive tasks. Functionally, there seems to be partial agreement amongst researchers in the field of cognitive neuroscience that the P2 represents some aspect of higher-order perceptual processing, modulated by attention. It is known that the P2 is typically elicited as part of the normal response to visual stimuli and has been studied in relation to visual search and attention, language context information, and memory and repetition effects. The amplitude of the peak of the waveform may be modulated by many different aspects of visual stimuli, which allow it to be used for studies of visual cognition and disease. In general, the P2 may be a part of cognitive matching system that compares sensory inputs with stored memory.

== History ==
An EEG waveform showing a typical P2 signal after the N1 peak

The first mentions of an ERP component similar to that of the modern P2 were characterized in studies of basic visual and auditory evoked potentials. One of the first of such studies involved the presentation of flashing lights. Using this method, researchers found that a series of potential changes were consistently observed across repeated trials. These would later be classified as components of the visual evoked response (VER), part of which includes the P2.

The P2 follows the visual N1 (or auditory N100) and P1 waveforms (negativity and positivity at 150 and 100ms respectively) and is followed by the N200, P3, and N400 waveforms. Other components may overlap with the P2 to some extent, making it difficult to distinguish clearly between them, depending on the location of measurement. Originally, the P2 was characterized as a sub-component of a complex involving the N1, P1 and P2, which was known as the vertex potential and which was classically studied as a unitary phenomenon. In particular, the relationship between the N1 and P2 was thought to be important. The difference between the N1 and P2, known as the vertex amplitude, was found to be significantly larger for target than non-target stimuli and for rapid attention switching task. Further studies have subsequently examined the P2 separately from the N1 and have found that the amplitude of the P2 itself is larger for target stimuli that are less frequent. This is similar to the P3, though the P2 is usually seen for more simple features than the P3. In the auditory domain, there is evidence of enhanced P2 amplitudes even when a target stimuli is not embedded in a series of identical stimuli. In these instances, enhanced P2 amplitudes have been associated with auditory learning and repeated stimulus exposure. Enhanced P2 amplitudes have been reported in musicians with extensive listening experience as well as laboratory based auditory training experiments. A significant finding is that P2 amplitude changes are sometimes seen independent of N1 amplitude changes, again suggesting some degree of independence of N1, and P2 latencies and amplitudes appear to be affected by old age.

In terms of modality, the visual P2 is similar to the auditory P2 and both have been studied in similar contexts. There are most likely multiple distinct P2s in different modalities, including both frontal and posterior visual P2s, which may or may not have similar origins or functional similarities. It is not yet understood whether the visual, auditory or other P2s reflect the same functional and neural activities.

== Component characteristics ==
Like other evoked-response potentials, the presence of the P2 is revealed in the waveform of the EEG recorded by time-locking data from trials to the onset of the stimulus, in appropriate paradigms. As data from the recordings of multiple trials are averaged together, the persistent characteristics of the P2 become apparent. The fact that this waveform appears stable across similar trials is what suggests that it is a meaningful response to a given stimulus.

Using electrodes attached to the earlobes of participants as a reference the visual P2 can be found over anterior and central sites on the scalp, and is usually maximal over the frontal region. The more posterior P2 has been studied in relation to visual complexity in language processing, visual search tasks and memory and repetitions paradigms. The component is evoked as part of the normal response to visual stimuli, but the amplitude and latency (delay between stimulus and response) may be affected by exogenous factors, such as repeated visual stimuli. This component has been linked with higher-order perceptual and attentional processes, including feature analysis of geometric figures and visually presented words. The exact function and neural source of the P2 is not yet known, but some evidence indicates that the P2 may reflect general neural processes that occur when a visual (or other sensory) input is compared with an internal representation or expectation in memory or language context.

== Main paradigms ==
The P2 has traditionally been studied in the context of perception, with specific emphasis on how stimulus evaluation takes place. As such, multiple paradigms have been used in experiments seeking to understand how manipulations of sensory stimuli modulate the characteristics of the P2.

The visual P2 has been studied in the context of visual priming paradigms, oddball paradigms (where the amplitude is enhanced to targets), and studies of repetition in language. One of the more well-studied paradigms with regards to the visual P2 has classically been the visual search paradigm, which tests perception, attention, memory, and response selection. In this paradigm, participants are instructed to focus their attention at a central point on a screen. It is then that participants are given a cue indicating the identity of a target stimulus. Following a delay, participants are then presented with a set of items. Instructed to identify the location of the target stimulus, participants respond by button-pressing or some other method. Trials are classified as either "efficient" or "inefficient" based upon the relationship between the target stimuli and non-target stimuli, known as "distracters". In the case of efficient search arrays, the target object or stimuli does not share any features in common with the distracters in the array. Likewise, in an inefficient array, the targets share one or more features with the "distracters".

The visual P2 has also been studied in the context of the visual priming paradigm, which seeks to understand how prior information shapes future response. In this experimental design, participants are briefly presented with an image or word, followed by a delay, and a subsequent stimulus upon which participants must make a classification. Researchers have used the visual search paradigm with stimulus arrays and found that target stimuli elicited larger anterior P2 components compared with standards. This evidence suggests that top-down information processing about feature classification affected processing at the visual perception stage. Thus, the P2 may index mechanisms for selective attention, feature detection (including color, orientation, shape, etc.) and other early stages of item encoding.

With regard to the auditory P2, the primary paradigm used to study manipulations of this type of sensory information is the auditory oddball task. In this procedure, participants are presented with a stream of auditory stimuli: including frequent, standard stimuli as well as infrequent, target stimuli. Participants of such studies are asked to ignore the frequent standards and respond to the infrequent targets.

In general, increases in the attentiveness of the subject lead to decreased amplitude of the P2. Increased attention decreases the amount of search space, or number of associations that need to be made, and may facilitate feature classification in visual search at the stage of perceptual processing. More probable targets also lead to decreased amplitude of the P2, which is sensitive to the number of non-target (distracter) features in a visual search. The amplitude of the P2 is greater when the visual search is more efficient (selective attention), but this does not affect the latency.

== Functional sensitivity ==
=== General features of stimuli ===
Research using the visual search paradigm has shown that features such as color, size, and orientation of the stimulus have a necessary role in eliciting the P2 effect seen during trials of efficient search. Other characteristics, such as attention, repetition and probability of the stimulus also impact the amplitude of the P2. The diversity of these factors tends to suggest that the P2, as a response, is multidimensional with respect to its sensitivity to stimulus features.

=== Memory ===
Researchers have found evidence that the P2 is involved in memory processes. Differences in P200 peak amplitude suggest that anterior and posterior distributional differences are elicited during encoding of words for rote and elaborative memory tasks. While encoding the words across both memory tasks, participants who subsequently recalled less generated larger frontal amplitudes and smaller parietal/occipital amplitudes than those who recalled more. Also, researchers have found that the P200 (overlapping with the P300) was elicited in a digit span task when participants heard the reverse order of a digit series that they previously heard. This indicates that the P2 is sensitive to short-term working memory and recognition as well.

While these studies are not visual in nature, the relationship of the general waveform to memory capacity may have clinical applications (see below) that involve both visual and non-visual P2 components and points toward a consistent relationship between the two. In fact, researchers have found a similar memory effect for words that were presented visually. They found a repetition effect for words that had been studied in the left visual field, (encoded in the right hemisphere), but not in the right visual field. The P2 amplitude was bigger for words that had been seen before. This indicates that P2 amplitude is modulated by aspects of recognition and that there is a hemispheric difference (which may be important for language processing, see below).

=== Language ===
The P2 has also been found to be involved in language processes including sentential constraint and expectancy for a given word. Researchers found that the P2 component varied with the level of expectancy for a particular item in a sentence for right but not left visual field presentations, suggesting that the left hemisphere of the brain may use contextual information to prepare for the visual analysis of upcoming stimuli. For presentation biased to the left hemisphere, the P2 is larger (more positive) for strongly constrained sentence endings, independent of whether the actual word was the expected one or not. This has been interpreted as suggesting that the left hemisphere in particular uses top-down attentional mechanisms to prepare to process words that are likely to be expected. In some cases (for example, with pictures instead of words in sentences), it may also reflect matching of input with expectation.

=== Other visual stimuli ===
The P2 has also been found to be sensitive to other forms of visual cognitive processing. Researchers recorded visual evoked potentials in response to non-stereoscopic two-dimensional and three-dimensional images in order to study neurophysiological correlates of depth perception. These non-stereoscopic images depict depth using line drawings that can be perceived as three-dimensional by one eye as opposed to by binocular depth perception that is the result of different angles of view integrated between the two eyes. In this study, P2 amplitude was significantly larger in the condition with three-dimensional convex and concave images, than in condition with two-dimensional images. These changes were found for electrodes placed over bilateral parieto-occipital regions. This study showed that the P2 generated around the visual cortex region is sensitive to the difference between two and three-dimensional images, without using actual depth or information integrated across both eyes.

Much in line with observations of traditional visual search paradigms, the application of P2 studies to language research has shown that the amplitude of the P2 is sensitive to both the orthographic combinability and phonological consistency (neighborhood sizes for similar appearing and similar sounding words) in the reading of Chinese phonograms. High combinability and consistency Chinese characters elicited lower P2 amplitudes than low combinability and low consistency characters. The suggests that characters with high combinability or high consistency facilitated early stages of orthographic and phonological processing which lowered activation at the perceptual level and resulted in a less positive P2.

== Sources ==
The neural source of the visual P2 is difficult to ascertain given the limited spatial resolution of the ERP technique. Since the recordings obtained from the scalp reflect only the dipole moments created by post-synaptic potential changes, they are subject to several factors including orientation, magnitude, and number of generator dipoles. Thus, the observed topographies of the P2 observed in experimental conditions may not be indicative of their true source. It is thought that the visual P2 encompasses both a frontal and a posterior source component; in particular some of the neural activity may originate from the visual cortex in the occipital region, while the similar auditory P2 is likely generated at least in part in the auditory cortex in the temporal region and the reticular activating system. Ross and Tremblay recently showed different source locations for auditory evoked N1 and P2 sources using MEG.

In a visual semantic priming paradigm, P2 amplitude differences are associated with phase-locked theta brain wave oscillations. Among the complex of the P1, N1 and P2, the P2 shows the strongest task-related modulation of theta wave oscillations between congruent and incongruent tasks. Source analyses in this study and others showed that local generators of the P2 may originate in parieto-occipital regions.

Also, it is known that the visual P2 in monkeys is generated by neurons in area V2 of extrastriate cortex. Researchers used a combination of ERP, current source density (CSD) and multiunit activity (MUA) methods to locate the source of the P2 in the V2 layer of the visual cortex between 100–300 ms.

== Theory ==
At present, the P2 has been well-characterized in studies that focus primarily on visual sensation, such as the visual search paradigm. However, due to the wide range and diversity of factors that have been found to affect the characteristics of the P2, reaching a comprehensive theory of the underlying neural processes that the P2 reflects has been difficult.

One theory is that the P2 indexes some form of selective attention which identifies meaningful stimuli through feature suppression. One study suggests that the increased P2 found during trials of efficient visual searches reflected the ability for the brain to reduce search space. Such a hypothesis appears intuitive, as in the efficient visual arrays the targets share no features with the distracters. Thus, the distinct features of the distracters can be ignored for the purposes of a particular trial. Meanwhile, in the inefficient trials, the presence of shared features complicates such suppression, which might explain the observation that the amplitude of the P2 is decreased for such conditions. Likewise, this rationale may apply to contexts beyond traditional visual search paradigms, including language.

Some studies of the P2 have cited the presence of a repetition effect as evidence that the P2 in part represents some facet of a perceptual-matching process. Additionally, one could link previous observations in other studies such as those utilizing either visual search and visual priming paradigms to this perceptual-matching process, suggesting that the activity related to the P2 represents some sort of a top-down process in which prior associations is accessed in the presence of stimuli. It would appear that by incorporating relevant associations into working memory, presented stimuli can be evaluated as being either similar or dissimilar to mental representations.

== Clinical applications ==
The visual P2 has been proposed to have clinical utility with regard to Alzheimer's disease diagnosis. Researchers have found that the latency of a P2 elicited by flashes of light is significantly increased in patients with dementia and early onset of Alzheimer's disease. It is also significantly delayed and interval between the P1 and the P2 was found to be significantly longer in patients with Alzheimer's disease compared to controls. This may suggest a defect in the pathway between visual cortex and the visual association center, where some believe the P2 originates from. Specifically, this latency pattern has been found over posterior electrode sites. As such, the latency of flash evoked P2 waveform may be useful as an early diagnostic tool for Alzheimer's disease or Alzheimer's risk, particularly when seen over the characteristic posterior sites.

== See also ==
- Bereitschaftspotential
- C1 and P1
- Contingent negative variation
- Difference due to memory
- Early left anterior negativity
- Error-related negativity
- Late positive component
- Lateralized readiness potential
- Mismatch negativity
- N2pc
- N100
- N170
- N200
- N400
- P3a
- P3b
- P300 (neuroscience)
- P600
- Somatosensory evoked potential
- Visual N1
