= P3a =

The P3a, or novelty P3, is a component of time-locked (EEG) signals known as event-related potentials (ERP). The P3a is a positive-going scalp-recorded brain potential that has a maximum amplitude over frontal/central electrode sites with a peak latency falling in the range of 250–280 ms. The P3a has been associated with brain activity related to the engagement of attention (especially orienting and involuntary shifts to changes in the environment) and the processing of novelty.

== History ==
In 1975 Squires and colleagues conducted a study attempting to resolve some of the questions surrounding what neural process the P300 reflects. At the time, several researchers suggested that there needed to be active attention towards the target stimuli in order to elicit a P300, in part because stimuli that were ignored resulted in a P300 with a smaller amplitude or no P300 at all. On the other hand, some research had shown that subjects exhibit a P300 to unpredictable stimuli in an ongoing repetitive series of stimuli, even when the stimuli were classified as irrelevant and subjects were asked to ignore them while completing another task (i.e. reading a book). It was intriguing that you could elicit a P300 in conditions with active attention and those of non-attention. Upon further investigation it turned out that when comparing the two types of P300 potentials, they differed in latency and scalp topography. This led Squires et al. to suggest that there were two distinct psycho-physiological entities that had been referred to collectively as the P300.

More specifically, Squires et al. recorded EEG during an auditory odd-ball paradigm with various conditions. The two types of stimuli were 90 dB and 70 db tone bursts that occurred 1.1 sec apart. Loud tones occurred with a probability of .9, .5, or .1, while the soft tones occurred with complementary probability. In addition, subjects completed blocks of stimuli under instruction to count the number of loud tones, count the number of soft tones, or ignore the tones and quietly read. Therefore, each set of instructions was performed at each of the probability combinations. Squires et al. found that when subjects were told to ignore the tones, the less frequent or rare tone (probability of .1) elicited a positive-going potential which occurred between 220 and 280 ms. They termed this potential the P3a in order to distinguish it from its relative, the P3b, which was a positive-going potential that occurred at 310–380 ms when the infrequent tones were attended to. Scalp distribution helped them differentiate the two potentials as well. The newly coined "P3a" had a peak amplitude occurring at frontal midline sites while the P3b peak amplitude occurred over parietal midline sites.

== Component characteristics ==
Consistent with this historical separation of the two components, typically if a stimulus is a rare non-target then the recorded EEG waveform has characteristics associated with the P3a, whereas attended targets elicit a P3b. With now-extensive research, it is also possible to dissociate these components even when the experimental context is different and/or less well-studied. P3a amplitudes tend to be maximal over frontal/central sites on the scalp, such as FCz/Cz in the international 10-20 system, which is the standard electrode placement system of many ERP labs around the world. P3b amplitudes are generally greater at sites like Pz. Latency is another distinguishing characteristic. While many things can affect the latency of the P3b, P3a latencies often occur 75-100 ms earlier than P3b peak latencies, and around 250-280 ms. Finally, the two responses have different functional sensitivities and associated psychological correlates.

== Main paradigms ==
The 3-stimulus oddball paradigm is one of the primary paradigms used to elicit a prominent P3a. As the name implies, the paradigm includes three types of stimuli: frequent, attended "standards", less frequent, attended "target" stimuli and a third "deviant" stimulus type. This paradigm is a modification of the oddball task that is used to elicit a P3b. In this task, infrequent-nontarget stimuli are dispersed throughout a sequence of task-relevant target and standard stimuli. When these infrequent, novel stimuli (for example, the sound of dog barks or color forms) are presented in the series of more typical target and standard stimuli (for example, tones or letters of the alphabet), a P3a that is larger over the frontal and central areas of the brain is produced in response to auditory, visual, and somatosensory stimuli. Deviant stimuli from auditory, visual, and somatosensory modalities are all sufficient for eliciting a P3a. For example, Grillon and colleagues used this design when they tested for the effects of rare non-target (deviant) auditory stimuli on subjects' EEG activity. They used 1600 Hz tones as the standard stimuli, while a 900 Hz tone represented the rare target stimuli. In the “Novel” condition, they added a rare non-target tone at 700 Hz. In their results it was apparent that the P300 they recorded to the rare non-target tones was in fact a P3a. The rare non-target tones resulted in a P300 (P3a) with a shorter latency that was distributed more towards the front of the scalp when compared to the P300 (P3b) elicited by rare target stimuli.

The 3 stimulus oddball paradigm provides a flexible way to examine the P3a across stimulus modality and tasks. Yamaguchi and Knight conducted a study using mechanical tactile stimuli (finger taps) and electric shocks to the wrist within a 3-stimulus oddball paradigm. They were interested in seeing if subjects would elicit a P3a to novel somatosensory stimuli. They devised a design wherein subjects would receive finger taps to hand digits 2-5 and electric shocks to the wrist. Taps on the 2nd finger were considered standards (76% probability) while taps on the 5th finger were targets (12% prob.). Taps occurring on the 3rd and 4th digits were considered “tactile novel” stimuli (6% prob.) and electric shocks to the wrist were shock novels (6% prob.). They found that both types of the novel somatosensory stimuli did in fact produce P3a's that had a more frontal distribution than responses to target stimuli. Shock novels also resulted in a significantly shorter P3a latency.

== Functional sensitivity ==
Two important factors for determining the amplitude of the P3a include habituation and target discrimination. One major difference between the P3b and the P3a is that only the P3a habituates with repeated presentation. The habituation indicates that some sort of memory encoding for the event has been created, and for this reason the event no longer generates a response when repeated. Each time a novel event is experienced, it is compared to the previously created neural representation, and, if it is sufficiently deviant, then the process begins again. If this event is not sufficiently deviant (i.e., it is the same) then habituation occurs. The P3a's rapid amplitude reduction with exposure to repeated trials of novel stimuli supports the idea that the P3a is the electrophysiological representation of the orienting response (which also habituates in behavior). For example, Grillon and colleagues used a 3 stimulus odd-ball paradigm wherein they presented subjects with a condition in which the deviant stimuli were constant and a condition in which the deviant stimuli were always novel. Their results showed the largest P3a amplitude in response to deviant stimuli that were novel.

Another factor that affects P3a amplitude is target discrimination. It is interesting that although the P3a is elicited by non-target deviant stimuli, the nature of the target stimuli affect the P3a response. It seems that the amplitude of the P3a may be affected by an individual's ability to distinguish target stimuli from standard stimuli. When this discrimination is easy, non-target deviant stimuli produce a P300 that is smaller than the target P3b and is largest over parietal sites. However, if target discrimination is difficult, the P3a to non-target stimuli is larger and more frontally-skewed with a shorter latency—in other words, the more "canonical" P3a response

Although the P3a has been dissociated from the P3b, its amplitude and latency may be affected by factors that also modulate the P3b. Some of these factors include stimulus probability, stimulus evaluation difficulty, natural state variables (such as circadian and menstrual cycles), and environmentally induced state variables (such as drugs and exercise). John Polich and Albert Kok have written up an extensive review that covers many of these variables.

== Theory ==
The P3a has been linked with novelty or orienting and involuntary shifts to changes in the environment. Some have suggested that the P3a and P3b are variants of the same ERP response that varies in scalp topography as a function of attention and task demands. In other cases, however, the two can be dissociated: for example, patients with temporal-parietal lesions and an absent visual P3a response have partial preservation of their visual target P3b. These results indicate that at least partially non-overlapping neural circuits may be engaged during P3a and P3b generation.

Neural sources of the P3a have been hypothesized to arise from frontal lobe functioning and to involve frontal lobe attention mechanisms. Magnetic resonance imaging (MRI) studies looking at gray matter volume and P3a amplitude show stronger correlations when non-target, startling stimuli are viewed. Lesion studies indicate that prefrontal and temporal-parietal cortex contribute to auditory P3a generation. The P3a is suspected to also reflect interactions between the frontal lobe and the hippocampus, as patients with focal hippocampal lesions have reduced P3a amplitude from novel distracters.

== See also ==
- Bereitschaftspotential
- C1 and P1
- Contingent negative variation
- Difference due to memory
- Early left anterior negativity
- Error-related negativity
- Late positive component
- Lateralized readiness potential
- Mismatch negativity
- N2pc
- N100
- N170
- N200
- N400
- P3b
- P200
- P300 (neuroscience)
- P600
- Somatosensory evoked potential
- Visual N1
