= P3b =

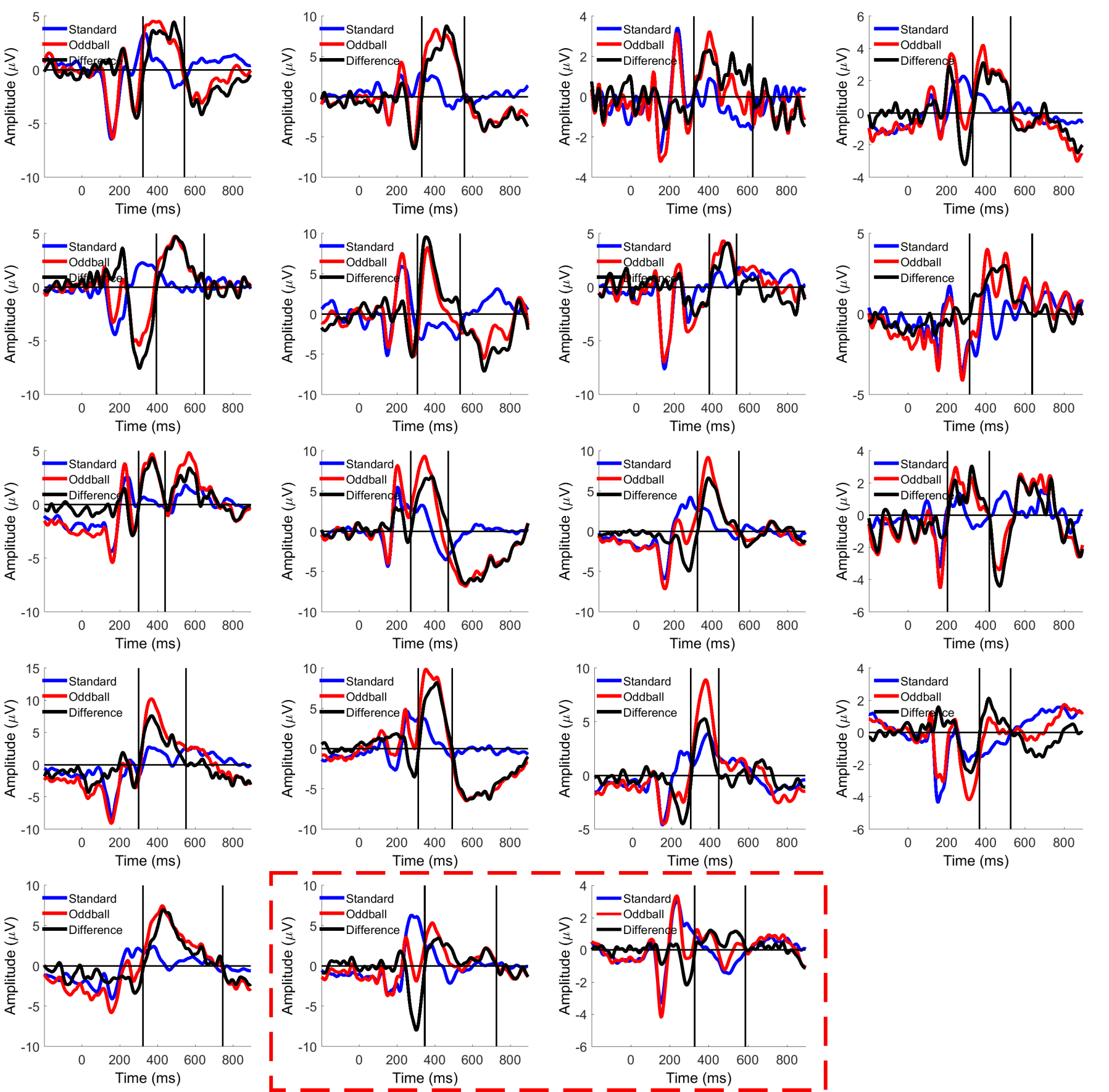
The P300 response of different healthy subjects in a two-tone auditory oddball paradigm. The plots show the average response to oddball (red) and standard (blue) trials and their difference (black). From Surprise response as a probe for compressed memory states. These examples show the significant individual variability in amplitude, latency and waveform shape across different subjects.

The P3b is a subcomponent of the P300, an event-related potential (ERP) component that can be observed in human scalp recordings of brain electrical activity. The P3b is a positive-going amplitude from 250 to 500 ms or later depending upon the task and on the individual subject response. Amplitudes are typically highest on the scalp over parietal brain areas.

The P3b has been a prominent tool used to study cognitive processes for several decades. More specifically, this ERP component has played a key role in cognitive psychology research on information processing. Generally speaking, improbable events will elicit a P3b, and the less probable the event, the larger the P3b. However, in order to elicit a P3b, the improbable event must be related to the task at hand in some way (for example, the improbable event could be an infrequent target letter in a stream of letters, to which a subject might respond with a button press). The P3b can also be used to measure how demanding a task is on cognitive workload.

== History ==
Early observations of the P3b were reported in the mid-1960s. In 1964, researchers Chapman and Bragdon. found that ERP responses to visual stimuli differed depending on whether the stimuli had meaning or not. They showed subjects two kinds of visual stimuli: numbers and flashes of light. Subjects viewed these stimuli one at a time in a sequence. For every two numbers, the subjects were required to make simple decisions, such as telling which of the two numbers was numerically smaller or larger, which came first or second in the sequence, or whether they were equal. When examining evoked potentials to these stimuli (i.e., ERPs), Chapman and Bragdon found that both the numbers and the flashes elicited the expected sensory responses (e.g., visual N1 components), and that the amplitude of these responses varied in an expected fashion with the intensity of the stimuli. They also found that the ERP responses to the numbers, but not to the light flashes, contained a large positivity that peaked around 300 ms after the stimulus appeared. They also noted that the amplitude of this positivity was not affected by the intensity of the stimulus. Chapman and Bragdon speculated that this differential response to the numbers, which came to be known as the P300 response, resulted from the fact that the numbers were meaningful to the participants, based on the task that they were asked to perform.

In 1965, Sutton and colleagues published results from two experiments that further explored this late positivity. They presented subjects with either a cue that indicated whether the following stimulus would be a click or a flash, or a cue which required subjects to guess whether the following stimulus would be a click or a flash. They found that when subjects were required to guess what the following stimulus would be, the amplitude of the "late positive complex" was larger than when they knew what the stimulus would be. In a second experiment, they presented two cue types. For one cue there was a 2 in 3 chance that the following stimulus would be a click and a 1 in 3 chance that the following stimulus would be a flash. The second cue type had probabilities that were the reverse of the first. They found that the amplitude of the positive complex was larger in response to the less probable stimuli, or the one that only had a 1 in 3 chance of appearing. Another important finding from these studies is that this late positive complex was observed for both the clicks and flashes, indicating that the physical type of the stimulus (auditory or visual) did not matter.

In later studies published in 1967, Sutton and colleagues had subjects guess whether they would hear one click or two clicks. They observed a positivity around 300 ms after the second click occurred or would have occurred in the case of the single click. They also had subjects guess how long the interval between clicks might be, and the late positivity occurred 300 ms after the second click. This shows two important findings: first that this late positivity occurred when the uncertainty about the type of click was resolved, and second that even an absence of a stimulus, when it was relevant to the task, would elicit the late positive complex. These early studies encouraged the use of ERP methods to study cognition and provided a foundation for the extensive work on the P3b in the decades that followed.

Since the initial discovery of this ERP component, research has shown that the P300 is not a unitary phenomenon. Rather, we can distinguish between two subcomponents of the P300: the novelty P3, or P3a, and the classic P3, or P3b. This article focuses on the P3b.

== Component characteristics ==
Assuming that a cephalic reference is used (i.e., a reference electrode placed somewhere on the head, such as the tip of the nose or the chin), the P3b is a positive-going ERP whose latency at peak amplitude is usually about 300 ms to simple sensory stimuli. Amplitude has been defined as the difference between the mean pre-stimulus baseline voltage and the voltage of the largest (in this case, positive-going) peak of the ERP waveform in a specific time window. P3b amplitude is generally relatively large (10–20 microvolts), but varies systematically as a function of a number of important factors (see Functional significance: Factors that influence amplitude). Latency has been defined as the time from the onset of the stimulus (or whatever the desired point of measurement might be) to the point of maximum amplitude. The latency of the P3b is usually around 300 ms, though this can vary within a time window of around 250–500 ms (or later) depending on factors such as task conditions and the age of the subjects (see Functional significance: Factors influence latency).

The scalp distribution of P3b is generally larger over parietal areas. However, using a 15-electrode setup with a linked-earlobe reference and an oddball task (described below), researchers have also found that the positivity increased moving from frontal to parietal sites, and that females have a greater increase than males. Other research, using the International 10-20 System with a left mastoid reference and an oddball task, has shown that with increasing age, the distribution of P3b tends to shift more frontally. Thus, the exact distribution may be dependent upon the task, as well as the gender and age of the subjects.

== Main paradigms ==
The P3b can be observed in a variety of experimental contexts. The most common paradigms will either present infrequent, task-relevant stimuli as a way to elicit a P3b, or they will employ two tasks at the same time to use P3b as a measure of cognitive workload. Of course, any experimental paradigm in which participants are instructed to attend to and evaluate stimuli should elicit a P3b component, including selective attention tasks, explicit memory tasks, and visual search tasks (for thorough reviews of experimental paradigms which have been used to elicit this component, see Kok, 2001 and Verleger, 1997).

=== Oddball paradigms ===
Two classic paradigms are the two-stimulus oddball task and the three-stimulus oddball task, the latter of which is used to examine both P3b and P3a. In a classic two-stimulus oddball task, a sequence of visual stimuli is presented. For example, subjects might see a string of letters presented one at a time. A less frequent "target" or "oddball" stimulus such as the letter T is presented along with more frequent "standard" stimuli, such as the letter S. The subject is typically instructed to respond in some way (such as with a button press) only to the targets, and to ignore the standards. The P3b is typically observed around 300 ms after each presentation of the target (oddball) stimulus.

A three-stimulus oddball task is exactly like the two-stimulus oddball task, except that in addition to the targets and standards, an infrequent, deviant stimulus such as the letter "D" will appear. These are often known as deviant standards, because they are not the target of the task but they differ from the regular standard. The P3b has been shown to respond only to task-relevant stimuli, or the targets that are actively being searched for (in this example, the letter T). Therefore, the deviant standard "D" will not elicit a strong P3b because it is not relevant to the task. However, the deviant standard will still elicit an earlier, positive-going potential that is usually higher over frontal sites known as the P3a. Unlike the P3b, the P3a will habituate with repeated presentations.

=== Dual-task paradigms ===
Another set of paradigms used to study the P3b are dual task paradigms. There are several variations of the dual task paradigm, and they can be used to study cognitive workload (see Kok, 2001). Workload can be defined as the amount of processing resources required for a particular task. In a dual-task paradigm, participants are given two tasks to perform simultaneously; a primary task and a secondary task. Though the primary task can be of virtually any type, the secondary task should involve some traditional P300 paradigm (e.g., an oddball task). When these tasks are performed concurrently, we would expect to see a reduction in P3b amplitude in response to the secondary task if the primary task requires some stimulus evaluation resources. Furthermore, the extent of this reduction is presumed to reflect the amount of workload associated with the primary task. In fact, there should be a reciprocal relationship between the amplitudes of the P3b response elicited by the primary and secondary tasks, respectively. If the primary task is easier (i.e., requires less stimulus evaluation resources), participants have more resources left over to devote to the secondary task. Conversely, if the primary task is harder (i.e., requires more stimulus evaluation resources), participants have less resources left over to devote to the secondary task.

To give an example, subjects might perform a primary task, such as tracking a visual object on a screen with a joystick, concurrently with a secondary task of mentally counting oddballs in an auditory stream. The difficulty of the primary task is usually manipulated in various ways, and the impacts of these manipulations on the P3b response to the secondary task are examined. For example, in one condition subjects might track the one-dimensional movement of an object (only up and down), and in the more difficult condition they might have to track two dimensional movement (any direction on a computer screen). A motor manipulation like this will typically impact reaction times on the secondary task, but will not impact the P3b response. However, if you increase the demand on working memory or other cognitive resources during the primary task, for example by adding objects to the screen or only having subjects selectively attend to one part of the screen, the amplitude of the P3b in response to oddballs in the secondary task will diminish. The amount that it diminishes can be a measure of how many working memory or stimulus evaluation resources are being used by the primary task.

In another variation of the dual-task paradigm, subjects are presented with a visual stream of items presented one at a time. In this stream there are two targets, each of which requires a separate response. The amount of time or items separating the two targets is varied, and the amplitude of the P3b in response to the second item is examined. Diminished amplitude of the P3b response to the second target would be expected when the first target required more processing or working memory resources.

== Functional significance: Factors that influence amplitude ==
=== Cognitive variables ===
The P300 response as a function of the global probability of the oddball stimulus. From Surprise response as a probe for compressed memory states. The ERP shows a larger P300 response magnitude to oddball stimuli and a lower P300 response to standard stimuli as the global oddball probability decreases.

The P300 response as a function of local stimulus probability. From Surprise response as a probe for compressed memory states. The P300 response magnitude for both oddball and standard trials is larger the higher is the local probability of the opposite stimulus in the preceding sequence.

Donchin stated that the less probable the event, the larger the P3b amplitude will be. There are several types of probability that can affect P3b amplitude: global probability, or how frequent the targets are relative to the number of standards (for example, P3b amplitude is greater when targets make up 10 percent of the stimuli than when targets comprise 20 percent of the stimuli); local probability, or the probability within the specific sequence of the events (for example, whether a target followed a standard or another target); and temporal probability, or how frequently targets occur within a one-minute time period (whether standards are present or not).

Ray "Skip" Johnson, Jr., now a professor at Queens College, published a triarchic model of P300 amplitude in 1986. Although he does not explicitly refer to P3b in this paper, most of his discussions refer to P3b. He offered three things that affected the amplitude – subjective probability, stimulus meaning, and information transmission. He summarized his view in the following formula: P300 amplitude = f[T x (1/P + M)], where P is subjective probability, M is stimulus meaning, and T is information transmitted. He describes subjective probability as objective probability with the added element of human judgment of how relevant a stimulus is to the task, and notes that P300 amplitude is directly related to the amount of uncertainty that is reduced by a stimulus. A closely related dependence between the P300 and subjective probability was shown by Levi-Aharoni et al. who used a fuzzy, compressed representation of stimulus probability to explain the single-trial variability in the P300 response magnitude. However, it has also been found that P300 amplitude can change in the absence of changes in probability. Stimulus meaning therefore refers to variables that account for the processing of a stimulus that are not related to probability. (Recall that Chapman and Bragdon found that only the stimulus that had meaning in their experiment elicited the late positivity.) Stimulus meaning encompasses three independent variables that can be manipulated – task complexity (how difficult a task is, or how many tasks must be performed at once), stimulus complexity (perceptual demand, or how many relevant features of the stimulus must be processed – a face being more complex than a dot), and stimulus value (the significance, or for example the monetary value: the greater the value the larger the P300 amplitude). Information transmission is the proportion of stimulus information received by a person relative to how much information the stimulus originally contained. There are external and internal manipulations of information transmission. When much information is lost for external reasons, for example because the stimulus is harder to discriminate or perceive, P300 amplitude is lower. Internal manipulations are variations in how much attention subjects are required or allowed to give to the stimulus. P3b requires attention, and increasing the difficulty of maintaining attention will correspondingly decrease P3b amplitude. To summarize, Johnson describes that probability on many levels, the relevance of the stimulus to the task, and the amount information a stimulus transmits are all variables that will determine P3b amplitude.

More recently, Albert Kok reviewed the literature on cognitive workload, and concluded that P3b amplitude depends on the demands on cognitive capacity. In dual-task paradigms like those described above, subjects are required to perform a primary and a secondary task. When the primary task is more perceptually and cognitively demanding, the P3b amplitude in response to oddballs in the secondary task is decreased. Kok also supports aspects of Johnson's theory, stating that the amount of attention allocated to a task, the relevance of the stimulus to the task, and the probability of the stimulus will all help determine what the P3b amplitude will be.

Consistently with the models by Johnson and Kok, a model of the P300 response magnitude was proposed by Levi-Aharoni, Shriki and Tishby, based on the Information Bottleneck framework and a prediction-error model by Rubin et al. Their results show that the single-trial variability in the P300 response magnitude can be explained by a subjective surprise that is constructed from compressed probability representations, dependent on the memory capacity allocated to the task and on the relevant features of preceding stimuli for predicting the upcoming stimulus. According to this model, the higher is the allocated memory capacity, the more accurate is the stimulus representation and the larger is the surprise response deviants are expected to elicit. Furthermore, based on this dependency they proposed a method to utilize the individual P300 response to obtain an estimate of individual recent memory capacity.

=== Gender, learning, and asymmetries ===
Other variables have been found to influence P3b amplitude. Some research using oddball tasks has indicated that females have larger P3b amplitudes than males, and that the amplitude increases more moving from frontal to parietal areas. Other research has found that learning in a topic area can affect P3b amplitude in tasks related to that area. One study took a group of individuals and gave some of them training in standard musical chord progressions while the others remained untrained. All were then given chord sequences that contained violations. Researchers found that those who had received prior training had greater P3b amplitudes in response to harmonic violations in musical sequences. This is presumably because those with training had more experience with the rules that govern harmonics, and therefore have a larger degree of expectancy for chord progressions and are more sensitive to deviance. There is also some evidence to suggest that in all subjects, P3b amplitude is distributed asymmetrically over the scalp. Research has shown that P3b amplitudes are systematically larger over the right frontal and central hemispheres than the left, though there is some debate as to whether this is due to structural causes (such as skull thickness or cranial irregularities) or to cognitive causes.

=== Clinical variables ===
A number of clinical variables such as age, disease, mental illness, and substance use have been studied in relation to P3b amplitude. Many of these studies do not refer to the P3b explicitly, but most use oddball tasks and thus would most likely have elicited a P3b. As previously noted, the topography of the amplitude of P3b tends to shift more frontally with age, but amplitude in these frontal areas does not seem to be affected by age. Another study using an auditory oddball task showed that P300 amplitude was enlarged in unmedicated individuals with mild Parkinson's disease when compared with healthy controls. The same study also used older and younger groups of individuals with Parkinson's disease, and found that age itself did not have an effect on amplitude. Other studies have shown that individuals with schizophrenia have a marked reduction in P3b amplitude, suggesting impairments in working memory or other processing. Substance use has also been shown to affect P3b. Some studies show that alcoholics have larger P300 amplitudes in response to an auditory oddball task, but that alcoholics who have many alcoholic relatives have lower P300 amplitudes when compared to controls. This tendency for P3b amplitude to be weaker for those with a family history of alcoholism may be more general, in that other substance use disorders and related psychiatric disorders show the same reduction, often before the substance use was initiated. This particular reduction in P3b amplitude may be due to weak neuromodulatory factors in the brains of those liable to develop substance use problems. P300 amplitude also appears to be sensitive to pharmacological interventions. When twelve healthy subjects were given lorazepam (a benzodiazepine drug used to treat anxiety and sometimes depression) and asked to perform an oddball task, their P300 amplitude was reduced. These studies and others have shown that conditions that tend to influence cognition (such as age, disease, mental illness, and substance use) affect the amplitude of P3b or its distribution.

== Functional significance: Factors that influence latency ==
In line with the view that the P3b component reflects uncertainty resolution, there is evidence to suggest that time at which this component begins to appear in the ERP (i.e., its latency) corresponds to the time at which uncertainty is resolved. For example, Sutton et al. (1967) performed a study in which they manipulated when uncertainty could be resolved. More specifically, participants were presented with either single or double (auditory) clicks that varied in intensity. In one condition, participants were asked to report the number of clicks they heard. When a double click occurred, the P3b response occurred approximately 300 ms after the second click. More importantly, the timing of the P3b response was almost identical when only a single click was presented, suggesting that this component was generated based upon when the second click might have occurred. In fact, when the duration between the two clicks was manipulated, the onset of the P3b was delayed by the exact amount of time between them (e.g., when the second click was presented 500 ms after the first one, the P3b response occurred at 800 ms). In contrast, when participants were instructed to respond based upon the intensity of the clicks, the P3b response always occurred approximately 300 ms after the first click. Presumably, participants could determine the intensity of the clicks based upon the first one; thus, the first click resolved their uncertainty.

If in fact the latency of the P3b component reflects the timing of uncertainty resolution, then one might expect the latency of this component to be closely related to the difficulty of the evaluation or categorization. In fact, there is now ample evidence to support this claim. For example, McCarthy & Donchin (1981) presented participants with 3 x 3 matrices, each of which contained either the word 'LEFT' or the word 'RIGHT'. Their task was to respond when they located the direction word in the matrix, and the identity of the word determined what type of response they should make. McCarthy and Donchin found that the P3b component occurred significantly earlier when the rest of the items in the matrix were number signs (#), relative to when the rest of the items were random letters. In essence, the random letters served as "noise", which caused participants to take longer to identify the target word. Along these same lines, several other task manipulations which are thought to influence the difficulty of the evaluation or categorization involved have been found to influence P3b latency (e.g., decreasing the physical intensity of the stimuli; see Verleger, 1997 for a review). Collectively, these findings suggest that P3b latency reflects the amount of time it takes participants to evaluate or categorize the stimulus in question.

Given that performance indices (such as response times) have long been used in cognitive psychology to study the duration and/or timing of mental events, one might ask whether P3b latency simply provides a comparable neural index of these same processes. Research suggests that P3b latency is highly correlated with response times when participants are instructed to prioritize accuracy in their responses, but is less correlated with response times when participants are instructed to prioritize speed in their responses. This pattern of results suggests that the P3b primary reflects stimulus evaluation processes, whereas response times are thought to reflect both stimulus evaluation and response selection (but for a critique of this claim, see Verleger, 1997). More specifically, when participants are instructed to prioritize speed (i.e., to respond as quickly as possible), they may respond before stimulus evaluation is complete (which is consistent with the fact that participants tend to make more errors under these conditions). Additional support for this conclusion comes from the finding that P3b latency is not affected by experimental manipulations thought to influence response selection processes (e.g., stimulus-response compatibility), whereas reaction times are (e.g., McCarthy & Donchin, 1981). An important implication of this conclusion is that the P3b component can used to identify the "locus of interference" in many popular cognitive paradigms. For example, Luck (1998) found that P3b latency was only slightly delayed during the psychological refractory period (PRP), suggesting that response time interference in this paradigm primarily reflects a delay in response selection.

Other factors which have been found to influence the latency of the P3b response include factors related to physiological arousal, such as heart rate and caffeine consumption, as well as factors related to cognitive capacity, such as age and differences in how rapidly individuals can allocate attentional resources.

== Theory ==
Several theories have been put forward about what cognitive processes the P3b reflects. Donchin proposed a "context updating model". This model posits that the brain constantly and automatically generates hypotheses about the environment and what it is about to experience. A P300 wave, including a P3b, is generated when the brain receives information that indicates that it needs to change these hypotheses, or update its mental model of the world. In other words, a P300 is elicited whenever there is sufficient information to indicate that the brain needs to update working memory. Though the "context updating" account is well supported by existing research, several alternative theories have been proposed. For example, Verleger and colleagues (2005) have proposed that the P3b component reflects a process that mediates between perceptual analysis and response initiation. More specifically, this process emerges from a cognitive mechanism responsible for monitoring whether the classification of a stimulus is appropriately translated into action. This theory constitutes a direct challenge to the widely held view that the P3b component reflects processes involved in perception but not response initiation (see Verleger, 1997).

Another theory proposed by Kok proposed that the P3b reflects mechanisms involved in event categorization, or the process that leads to the decision about whether an external stimulus matches or does not match an internal representation of a specific category or stimulus. Categorization requires processes such as attention, perception, and working memory, all of which are known to affect P3b amplitude (as reviewed above), and thus this model integrates the research findings on P3b. Kok also discusses another "template-matching model", where subjects are required to detect a target and create a representation or "template" of the stimulus, and the P3b is strongest when the template is matched by presented stimuli. The template-matching model is similar to the event categorization model, and suggests that the P3b reflects processes that underlie recognition memory (which can also require working memory.) The event-categorization model has similarities to the model proposed by Verleger that suggests that the P3 is generated during the "closure" of a perceptual cycle. The cognitive version of Verleger's model suggests that the P3b is generated when a decision is made that a stimulus belongs to a task-relevant category. As Kok summarizes, P3b appears to integrate processes that are required to identify and match a stimulus with some kind of internal representation.

== Neural origins ==
The neural generators of the P3b are highly debated. Early studies using electrodes implanted in the brain indicated that the hippocampal formation might generate the P300. However, later work found that if the hippocampus is lesioned or damaged, the P300 is still generated and no reliable differences in its amplitude or latency are observed. Subsequent research found that lesioning the temporal-parietal lobe junction significantly affected P300 production, indicating that this area may contain one or more generators of the P3b. This suggests that the P3b might indicate some kind of circuit pathway between frontal and temporal/parietal brain areas. A temporal-parietal generator would be logical, because P3b appears to be elicited when attentional resource activations promote working memory and other processes in temporal-parietal areas. Further EEG research utilizing source modeling techniques, along with research using alternative brain imaging methods (e.g., fMRI, MEG), intracranial recordings, and brain injury patients, has also indicated that the P3b component originates from activation in the parietal and temporal lobes of the cerebral cortex. There is also some evidence that activation is certain limbic structures, such as the anterior cingulate cortex, may contribute to the P3b component.

It is not yet known which neurotransmitter systems are responsible for the generation of P3b. The temporal-parietal region is densely populated by norepenepherine inputs, and there is some evidence that the locus coeruleus norepinephrine system might be responsible for generating the P3b. Because many of these studies were conducted using animals, further research is needed to determine the neurotransmitters that are responsible for P3b generation.

== See also ==
- Bereitschaftspotential
- C1 and P1
- Contingent negative variation
- Difference due to memory
- Early left anterior negativity
- Error-related negativity
- Late positive component
- Lateralized readiness potential
- Mismatch negativity
- N2pc
- N100
- N170
- N200
- N400
- P3a
- P200
- P300 (neuroscience)
- P600
- Somatosensory evoked potential
- Visual N1
