= Orienting response =

Organism's immediate response to a change in its environment

The orienting response (OR), also called orienting reflex, is an organism's immediate response to a change in its environment, when that change is not sudden enough to elicit the startle reflex. The phenomenon was first described by Russian physiologist Ivan Sechenov in his 1863 book Reflexes of the Brain, and the term ('ориентировочный рефлекс' in Russian) was coined by Ivan Pavlov, who also referred to it as the Shto takoye? (Что такое? or What is it?) reflex. The orienting response is a reaction to novel or significant stimuli. In the 1950s the orienting response was studied systematically by the Russian scientist Evgeny Sokolov, who documented the phenomenon called "habituation", referring to a gradual "familiarity effect" and reduction of the orienting response with repeated stimulus presentations.

Researchers have found a number of physiological mechanisms associated with OR, including changes in phasic and tonic electrodermal activity (EDA), electroencephalogram (EEG), and heart rate following a novel or significant stimulus. These observations all occur within seconds of stimulus introduction. In particular, EEG studies of OR have corresponded particularly with the P300 wave and P3a component of the OR-related event-related potential (ERP).

== Neural correlates ==
Current understanding of the localization of OR in the brain is still unclear. In one study using fMRI and EDA, researchers found novel visual stimuli associated with EDA responses typical of an OR also corresponded to activation in the hippocampus, anterior cingulate gyrus, and ventromedial prefrontal cortex. These regions are also believed to be largely responsible for emotion, decision making, and memory. Increases in activity within the cerebellar and extrastriate cortex were also recorded, which are significantly implicated in visual perception and processing.

== Function ==
When an individual encounters a novel environmental stimulus, such as a bright flash of light or a sudden loud noise, they will pay attention to it even before identifying it. This orienting reflex seems to be present early in development, as babies will turn their head toward an environmental change (Nelson Cowan, 1995). From an evolutionary perspective, this mechanism is useful in reacting quickly to events that call for immediate action.

=== Habituation ===
Sokolov's investigation of OR was primarily motivated in understanding habituation. Provided the first introduction of a novel stimulus, defined in Sokolovian terms as any change from the "currently active neuronal model" (what the individual is currently focused on), results in OR. However, with repeated introduction of the same stimulus, the orienting response will decrease in intensity and eventually cease. When novel stimuli have an associated contextual significance, repeated stimulus will still result in a sequentially decreasing OR, though at a modified rate of decay.

=== Orienting in decision-making ===
The orienting response is believed to play an integral role in preference formation. When faced with deciding between two options, subjects in studies by Simion & Shimojo were shown to choose the items they preferentially orient their gaze toward. This gaze can occur while the stimulus is present or after it has been removed, the latter causing gaze to be fixated at the point in which the stimulus had been present. Gaze bias ceases following a decision, suggesting that gaze bias is the cause of preference and not its effect. Noting this postulated causal link with the irrelevance of a stimulus presence, it is argued that gaze orientation supports decision-making mechanisms in inducing a preferential bias.

=== Role between emotion and attention ===
Both novelty and significance of a stimulation are implicated in the generation of an orienting response. Specifically, the emotional significance of a stimulus, defined by its level of pleasantness, can affect the intensity of the orienting response toward focusing attention on a subject. Studies showed that during exposure to neutral and emotionally significant novel images, both pleasant and unpleasant images produced higher skin conductance readings than neutral images. With repeated stimulation, all skin conductance readings diminished relative to novel introduction, though with emotionally significant content diminishing more slowly. Conversely, studies observing cardiac deceleration during novel stimuli introduction showed significantly more deceleration for unpleasant stimuli compared to pleasant and neutral stimuli. These findings suggest that OR represents a combination of responses that act in tandem to a common stimulus. More importantly, the differences between emotionally charged and neutral stimuli demonstrates the influence of emotion in orienting attention, despite novelty.

== In relation to therapy ==
The orienting response has been posited as being stimulated by bilateral stimulation, and being the active ingredient in Eye movement desensitization and reprocessing (EMDR) therapy.

== In popular culture ==
In his 2007 book The Assault on Reason, Al Gore posited that watching television affects the orienting response, an effect similar to vicarious traumatization.

== See also ==
- Information metabolism
- Browsing
- Perception
- Attention
- Interest (emotion)
- Startle response
