= Late positive component =

The late positive component or late positive complex (LPC) is a positive-going event-related brain potential (ERP) component that has been important in studies of explicit recognition memory. It is generally found to be largest over parietal scalp sites (relative to reference electrodes placed on the mastoid processes), beginning around 400–500 ms after the onset of a stimulus and lasting for a few hundred milliseconds. It is an important part of the ERP "old/new" effect, which may also include modulations of an earlier component similar to an N400. Similar positivities have sometimes been referred to as the P3b, P300, and P600. Here, we use the term "LPC" in reference to this late positive component.

== History ==
In psychological literature on memory, long-term memory (LTM) is commonly divided into two types: semantic and episodic. Semantic memories are memories that are stored in LTM without specific encoding information linked to them, and thus represent general knowledge about the world that a person has acquired across the lifespan. Episodic memories are memories that are stored in long-term memory as specific "episodes" and that, therefore, have some sort of specific context information associated with them, such as where or when they were encoded. At retrieval, episodic memories are often divided into two different categories based on how much information is available about the "episode." These two categories are recollection and familiarity. Recollection is when certain information about the context of the memory at encoding, for instance when or where a memory was encoded, is recalled. Familiarity is a general sense that a person has seen something before without any other details about the event. Even though they are divided into two categories, it is currently debated whether they are separate entities controlled by different brain functions or just a graded continuum of the same function.

The component that came to be called the LPC has been associated with episodic memory and was first described in ERP studies examining either repetition or recognition effects. In both paradigms, studies found that ERPs to repeated/recognized items differed from those to newly presented ones in several ways. In particular, second presentations of items were associated with increased positivity between 500 and 800 ms post-stimulus onset—an effect that came to be called the LPC. but also referred to as the P300, late positivity or "parietal old/new effect". In one of the earliest examples of such a study, Friedman (1990) presented test items in a continuous recognition paradigm (in which study and test trials are intermingled). Results showed that ERPs to old items were characterized by decreases in a negativity between 300 and 500 ms (N400) and increases in a subsequent, partially overlapping positivity (LPC/P300). The joint increase in positivity across these two responses was termed the "old/new" effect.

== Main paradigms ==
The main paradigm that is used to elicit and study the LPC involves a two part, study-test design. In the "study" phase, the participant is given a list of words or other items to be remembered, presented one at a time. The participant may be told to try to remember these items for later ("intentional" encoding), or may be asked to make judgments about the item without realizing that there will later be a memory test for the items ("incidental" encoding). Then, after some amount of time, the studied ("old") items are re-presented to the subjects, mixed with never before presented foils ("new" items), and subjects are asked to classify the items as old or new. During this test or retrieval phase, ERPs are recorded and the brain responses to both new and old words are analyzed. The results typically show a larger LPC for old than for new words. Note that if ERPs are also recorded during the study phase of the experiment, then responses during the test phase can be used to look at factors that predict later memory; this effect is known as the difference due to memory, or Dm.

As described above, a variant of the study-test paradigm is a continuous recognition paradigm, in which subjects are asked to classify every item as new or old and "study" items (first presentations) and "test" items (second presentations) are intermingled.

Variants of the paradigm manipulate what subjects are doing at encoding (for example, through a levels of processing manipulation, how long or how many times items are studied, what the delay between study and test is, and what kind of judgments subjects make at retrieval (for example, in addition to determining if an item is old or new, subjects might be asked to recall specific details of its learning context or to indicate their confidence in their memory judgments).

== Component characteristics ==
As reviewed by Friedman and Johnson, the LPC is typically seen in the form of a broad positivity between 400 and 800 ms post-stimulus onset. It is largest over medial, posterior scalp sites, and tends to be bigger over left hemisphere recording sites. It is larger for items that have been seen before, especially those correctly classified as "old", as compared with those correctly classified as "new". LPCs have been recorded to words, line drawings, sounds, and meaningless shapes, and it is seen in both long and short-term memory paradigms. It is believed to index recollective processes.

== Functional sensitivity ==
The LPC has been more associated with explicit memory than implicit memory. Although LPCs can be seen in repetition paradigms wherein items are repeated but subjects do not respond to those repetitions and are not asked to take note of them, LPC responses are bigger in tasks in which subjects make memory-related judgments. Rugg and colleagues (1998a) conducted a direct comparison of implicit and explicit retrieval ERPs. Specifically, in the explicit condition, participants performed an old/new recognition judgment on a list of words, half new and half repeated. In the implicit condition participants made living/nonliving judgment on the same material, so that repetition was task-irrelevant. Results revealed that repetition modulated LPC in the explicit task but not implicit task. Supporting evidence comes from studies of the effects of brain damage on the LPC, which have shown that the LPC effect is attenuated or eliminated in patients with bilateral hippocampal damage or damage to the medial temporal lobe (similar damage does not disrupt the N400 part of the old/new effect, suggesting it is more related to implicit memory).

There are many things that are known to change the amplitude of the LPC. The amplitude increases with all of the following: study-test repetitions, words that are reported as being consciously remembered (versus being familiar), correctly recognized words that are then later recalled, and words for which the context at encoding is recalled with the word. Furthermore, LPC amplitude is also sensitive to levels of processing manipulation, being larger for more deeply encoded items. Thus, these data suggest that the LPC amplitude is closely allied with recollection and reflects successful retrieval.

The LPC is also sensitive to decision accuracy. It is larger in response to correctly identified old words than it is to incorrectly identified old words. For example, Finnigan and colleagues (2002) extended the traditional old/new effect paradigm by presenting new unstudied words and old words which had been presented at study either once ("weak") or three times ("strong"). The probability of an "old" response was significantly higher for strong than weak words and significantly higher for weak than new words. Comparisons were made initially between ERPs to new, weak and strong words, and subsequently between ERPs associated with six strength-by-response conditions. Results showed the amplitude of LPC effect was sensitive to decision accuracy (and perhaps confidence). Its amplitude was larger in ERPs evoked by words attracting correct versus incorrect recognition decisions. The LPC effect had a left > right, centro-parietal scalp distribution (in ear-referenced ERPs). Therefore, in addition to the majority of studies in which interpreted LPC from the perspective of dual-process models (which dissociate familiarity and recollection), Finningan et al. (2002) provided alternative interpretations of LPC in terms of memory strength and decisional factors.

According to a study done by Mecklinger (1998), the scalp distribution of the LPC can vary with the type of material retrieved. When information was retrieved about an object, the distribution was right and centro-frontally centered. When the information retrieved was about spatial location, the distribution was bilaterally symmetric over the occipital lobe of the brain.

== Theory and sources ==
As reviewed by Rugg and Curran, the precise functional significance of the LPC continues to be debated. One early suggestion was that the effect reflects processes that contribute to the representation of recollected information. Alternatively, the effect might index attentional orienting to recollected information, rather than processes supporting its representation or maintenance. It has recently been argued that findings indicating that the effect varies according to the amount of information recollected are more consistent with the first of these two proposals.

The difference in the response pattern of the LPC, in comparison with other components elicited in memory tasks, such as the N400, has played an important role in debates about dual-process theories of memory, which postulate qualitatively different mechanisms underlying familiarity and recollection.

In terms of the neural source of the component, the characteristic scalp distribution of the LPC suggests that it might reflect neural activity generated in the lateral parietal cortex. Consistent with this hypothesis, fMRI studies report recollection-sensitive activity in this region. Furthermore, findings of direct functional parallels between these fMRI and ERP old/new effects give additional credence to the hypothesis that the ERP effect reflects activity in a recollection-sensitive region of the lateral parietal cortex. Results from studies of patients with brain damage, described above, indicate that medial temporal lobe areas and the hippocampus contribute to the processes indexed by the LPC, although perhaps not directly to the recorded scalp activity.

== See also ==
- Bereitschaftspotential
- C1 and P1
- Difference due to memory
- Lateralized readiness potential
- P3a
- P3b
- P200
- P300 (neuroscience)
- P600
- Somatosensory evoked potential
