= Mismatch negativity =

Component in a sequence of stimuli

The mismatch negativity (MMN) or mismatch field (MMF) is a component of the event-related potential (ERP) to an odd stimulus in a sequence of stimuli. It arises from electrical activity in the brain and is studied within the field of cognitive neuroscience and psychology. It can occur in any sensory system, but has most frequently been studied for hearing and for vision, in which case it is abbreviated to vMMN. The (v)MMN occurs after an infrequent change in a repetitive sequence of stimuli (sometimes the entire sequence is called an oddball sequence.) For example, a rare deviant (d) stimulus can be interspersed among a series of frequent standard (s) stimuli (e.g., s s s s s s s s s d s s s s s s d s s s d s s s s...). In hearing, a deviant sound can differ from the standards in one or more perceptual features such as pitch, duration, loudness, or location. The MMN can be elicited regardless of whether someone is paying attention to the sequence. During auditory sequences, a person can be reading or watching a silent subtitled movie, yet still show a clear MMN. In the case of visual stimuli, the MMN occurs after an infrequent change in a repetitive sequence of images.

MMN refers to the mismatch response in electroencephalography (EEG); MMF or MMNM refer to the mismatch response in magnetoencephalography (MEG).

== History ==
The auditory MMN was discovered in 1978 by Risto Näätänen, A. W. K. Gaillard, and S. Mäntysalo at the Institute for Perception, TNO in The Netherlands.

The first report of a visual MMN was in 1990 by Rainer Cammer. For a history of the development of the visual MMN, see Pazo-Alvarez et al. (2003).

== Characteristics ==
The MMN is a response to a deviant within a sequence of otherwise regular stimuli; thus, in an experimental setting, it is produced when stimuli are presented in a many-to-one ratio; for example, in a sequence of sounds s s s s s s s d s s s s d s s s..., the d is the deviant or oddball stimulus, and will elicit an MMN response. The mismatch negativity occurs even if the subject is not consciously paying attention to the stimuli. Processing of sensory stimulus features is essential for humans in determining their responses and actions. If behaviourally relevant aspects of the environment are not correctly represented in the brain, then the organism's behaviour cannot be appropriate. Without these representations our ability to understand spoken language, for example, would be seriously impaired. Cognitive neuroscience has consequently emphasised the importance of understanding brain mechanisms of sensory information processing, that is, the sensory prerequisites of cognition. Most of the data obtained, unfortunately, do not allow the objective measurement of the accuracy of these stimulus representations. In addition, recent cognitive neuroscience seems to have succeeded in extracting such a measure, however. This is the mismatch negativity (MMN), a component of the event-related potential (ERP), first reported by Näätänen, Gaillard, and Mäntysalo (1978). An in-depth review of MMN research can be found in Näätänen (1992) while other recent reviews also provide information on the generator mechanisms of MMN, its magnetic counterpart, MMNm (Näätänen, Ilmoniemi & Alho, 1994), and its clinical applicability.

The auditory MMN can occur in response to deviance in pitch, intensity, or duration. The auditory MMN is a fronto-central negative potential with sources in the primary and non-primary auditory cortex and a typical latency of 150-250 ms after the onset of the deviant stimulus. Sources could also include the inferior frontal gyrus, and the insular cortex. The amplitude and latency of the MMN is related to how different the deviant stimulus is from the standard. Large deviances elicit MMN at earlier latencies. For very large deviances, the MMN can even overlap the N100.

The visual MMN can occur in response to deviance in such aspects as color, size, or duration. The visual MMN is an occipital negative potential with sources in the primary visual cortex and a typical latency of 150-250 ms after the onset of the deviant stimulus.

== Neurolinguistics ==
As kindred phenomena have been elicited with speech stimuli, under passive conditions that require very little active attention to the sound, a version of MMN has been frequently used in studies of neurolinguistic perception, to test whether or not these participants neurologically distinguish between certain kinds of sounds. The MMN response has been used to study how fetuses and newborns discriminate speech sounds. In addition to these kinds of studies focusing on phonological processing, some research has implicated the MMN in syntactic processing. Some of these studies have attempted to directly test the automaticity of the MMN, providing converging evidence for the understanding of the MMN as a task-independent and automatic response.

However, the language-specific "phoneme effect" is not always replicated. A 2024 study by Dvořáková & Chládková on Czech and Russian speakers found no language-specific MMN amplitude modulation for native vs. non-native vowels, finding strong support for a null effect. This challenges the robustness of the MMN as a universal index of language-specific phoneme processing.

== For basic stimulus features ==
MMN is evoked by an infrequently presented stimulus ("deviant"), differing from the frequently-occurring stimuli ("standards") in one or several physical parameters like duration, intensity, or frequency. In addition, it is generated by a change in spectrally complex stimuli like phonemes, in synthesised instrumental tones, or in the spectral component of tone timbre. Also the temporal order reversals elicit an MMN when successive sound elements differ either in frequency, intensity, or duration. The MMN is not elicited by stimuli with deviant stimulus parameters when they are presented without the intervening standards. Thus, the MMN has been suggested to reflect change detection when a memory trace representing the constant standard stimulus and the neural code of the stimulus with deviant parameter(s) are discrepant.

== Vs. auditory sensory memory ==
The MMN data can be understood as providing evidence that stimulus features are separately analysed and stored in the vicinity of auditory cortex (for a discussion, please see the theory section below). The close resemblance of the behaviour of the MMN to that of the previously behaviourally observed "echoic" memory system strongly suggests that the MMN provides a non-invasive, objective, task-independently measurable physiological correlate of stimulus-feature representations in auditory sensory memory.

== Relationship to attentional processes ==
The experimental evidence suggests that the auditory sensory memory index MMN provides sensory data for attentional processes, and, in essence, governs certain aspects of attentive information processing. This is evident in the finding that the latency of the MMN determines the timing of behavioural responses to changes in the auditory environment. Furthermore, even individual differences in discrimination ability can be probed with the MMN. The MMN is a component of the chain of brain events causing attention switches to changes in the environment. Attentional instructions also affect MMN.

== In clinical research ==
The MMN has been documented in a number of studies to disclose neuropathological changes. Presently, the accumulated body of evidence suggests that while the MMN offers unique opportunities to basic research of the information processing of a healthy brain, it might be useful in tapping neurodegenerative changes as well.

MMN, which is elicited irrespective of attention, provides an objective means for evaluating possible auditory discrimination and sensory-memory anomalies in such clinical groups as dyslexics and patients with aphasia, who have a multitude of symptoms including attentional problems. Recent results suggest that a major problem underlying the reading deficit in dyslexia might be an inability of the dyslexics' auditory cortex to adequately model complex sound patterns with fast temporal variation. According to the results of an ongoing study, MMN might also be used in the evaluation of auditory perception deficits in aphasia.

Alzheimer's patients demonstrate decreased amplitude of MMN, especially with long inter-stimulus intervals; this is thought to reflect reduced span of auditory sensory memory. Parkinsonian patients do demonstrate a similar deficit pattern, whereas alcoholism would appear to enhance the MMN response. This latter, seemingly contradictory, finding could be explained by hyperexcitability of CNS neurones resulting from neuroadaptive changes taking place during a heavy drinking bout.

While the results obtained thus far seem encouraging, several steps need to be taken before the MMN can be used as a clinical tool in patient treatment. A focus of research in the late 1990s aimed to tackle some of the key signal-analysis problems encountered in development of clinical use of MMN and challenges still remain. Nevertheless, as it stands, clinical research employing the MMN has already produced significant knowledge on the CNS functional changes related to cognitive decline in the aforementioned clinical disorders.

A 2010 study found that MMN durations were reduced in a group of schizophrenia patients who later went on to have psychotic episodes, suggesting that MMN durations may predict future psychosis. Recent research advocates for the use of MMN in clinical intervention, because MMN can predict treatment response for patients with schizophrenia in the context of pro-cognitive therapeutics.

== Theory ==
The mainstream "memory trace" interpretation of MMN is that it is elicited in response to violations of simple rules governing the properties of information. It is thought to arise from violation of an automatically formed, short-term neural model or memory trace of physical or abstract environmental regularities. However, other than MMN, there is no other neurophysiological evidence for the formation of the memory representation of those regularities.

Integral to this memory trace view is that there are: i) a population of sensory afferent neuronal elements that respond to sound, and; ii) a separate population of memory neuronal elements that build a neural model of standard stimulation and respond more vigorously when the incoming stimulation violates that neural model, eliciting an MMN.

An alternative "fresh afferent" interpretation is that there are no memory neuronal elements, but the sensory afferent neuronal elements that are tuned to properties of the standard stimulation respond less vigorously upon repeated stimulation. Thus when a deviant activates a distinct new population of neuronal elements that is tuned to the different properties of the deviant rather than the standard, these fresh afferents respond more vigorously, eliciting an MMN.

A third view is that the sensory afferents are the memory neurons.

== See also ==
- Bereitschaftspotential
- C1 and P1
- Contingent negative variation
- Difference due to memory
- Early left anterior negativity
- Error-related negativity
- Late positive component
- Lateralized readiness potential
- N2pc
- N100
- N170
- N200
- N400
- Oddball paradigm
- P3a
- P3b
- P200
- P300 (neuroscience)
- P600 (neuroscience)
- Somatosensory evoked potential
- Visual N1
