= Somatosensory evoked potential =

Electrical activity in the brain

Somatosensory evoked potential (SEP or SSEP) is the electrical activity of the brain that results from the stimulation of touch. SEP tests measure that activity and are a useful, noninvasive means of assessing somatosensory system functioning. By combining SEP recordings at different levels of the somatosensory pathways, it is possible to assess the transmission of the afferent volley from the periphery up to the cortex. SEP components include a series of positive and negative deflections that can be elicited by virtually any sensory stimuli. For example, SEPs can be obtained in response to a brief mechanical impact on the fingertip or to air puffs. However, SEPs are most commonly elicited by bipolar transcutaneous electrical stimulation applied on the skin over the trajectory of peripheral nerves of the upper limb (e.g., the median nerve) or lower limb (e.g., the posterior tibial nerve), and then recorded from the scalp. In general, somatosensory stimuli evoke early cortical components (N25, P60, N80), generated in the contralateral primary somatosensory cortex (S1), related to the processing of the physical stimulus attributes. About 100 ms after stimulus application, additional cortical regions are activated, such as the secondary somatosensory cortex (S2), and the posterior parietal and frontal cortices, marked by a parietal P100 and bilateral frontal N140. SEPs are routinely used in neurology today to confirm and localize sensory abnormalities, to identify silent lesions and to monitor changes during surgical procedures.

== History ==
The modern history of SEPs began with George Dawson's 1947 recordings of somatosensory cortical responses in patients with myoclonus, a neurological condition characterized by abrupt, involuntary, jerk-like contractions of a muscle or muscle group. Because of their relatively large amplitude and low frequency compatible with a low sampling rate of A/D conversion, the cortical SEPs were the first studied in normal subjects and patients. In the 1970s and early 1980s spinal and subcortical (far-field) potentials were identified. Although the origins and mechanisms of far-field SEPs are still debated in the literature, correlations among abnormal waveforms, lesion site, and clinical observations are fairly well established. However, the most recent advances were brought about by multichannel recordings of evoked potentials coupled with source modeling and source localization in 3D images of brain volume provided by magnetic resonance imaging (MRI).

== Theory/source ==
Modeling sources from the field distribution results in models of brain activation that may substantially differ from the observations of clinical correlations between the abnormal waveform and the lesion site. The approach based on clinical correlations supports the idea of a single generator for each SEP component, which is suitable for responses reflecting the sequential activation fibers and synaptic relays of the somatosensory pathways. Conversely, source modeling suggests that the evoked field distribution at a given moment may result from activities of multiple distributed sources that overlap in time. This model fits better with the parallel activation and the feedback controls that characterize the processing of somatosensory inputs at the cortical level.

== Component characteristics ==
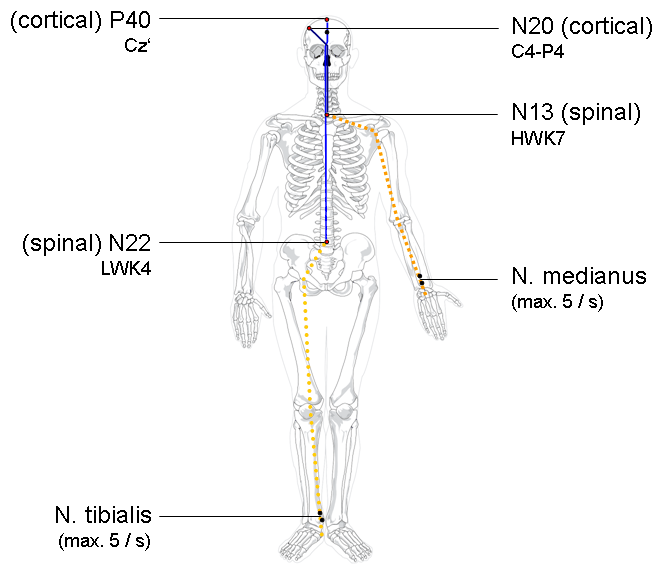
Way of nerve signal transduction and electrode positions for tibial (left) and median (right) nerve SEP recordings

When recording SEPs, one usually seeks to study peripheral, spinal, brainstem, and early cortical SEPs during the same run. Electrodes placed on the scalp pick up both SEPs generated in the cortex and thalamocortical fibers (which are picked up as near-field responses located in restricted areas) and far-field positivities reflecting the evoked activity generated in peripheral, spinal and brainstem somatosensory fibers.

The literature is filled with discussions about the most appropriate site for the reference electrode to record each of the components. Considering the field distribution, the optimal recording condition is in theory that in which the reference is not influenced by the activity under study. Most of the far-field potentials are widely distributed over the scalp. Consequently, they reach their maximal amplitude when the reference electrode is non-cephalic. A non-cephalic reference common to all channels is adequate for all near-field recordings. One relevant issue is that electrical physiological (electrocardiogram, electromyogram, etc.) noise level increases with the distance between the active and reference electrodes in non-cephalic reference montages. The routine four-channel montages proposed in the International Federation of Clinical Neurophysiology (IFCN) guidelines explore the afferent peripheral volley, the segmental spinal responses at the neck and lumbar spine levels, as well as the subcortical far-field and early cortical SEPs, using scalp electrodes placed in the parietal and frontal regions for upper limb SEPs and at the vertex for lower limb SEPs.

Median nerve SEP begins with the delivery of an electrical stimulus to that nerve at the wrist. A 100–300 microsecond square wave electrical pulse is delivered at intensities strong enough to cause a 1–2 cm thumb twitch. Upon delivery of such a stimulus, nerve action volleys travel up sensory fibers and motor fibers to the shoulder, producing a peak as they enter. This peak is formally known as N9. In the course of conduction, the sensory fibers then transverse the cervical roots and enter the cervical cord. The median nerve pathway then joins the posterior columns, sending off collateral branches to synapse in the midcervical cord. This midcervical cord activity gives rise to a peak known as N13. The N13 is best measured over the fifth cervical spine. Further conduction in the posterior columns passes through the synapse at the cervicomedullary junction and enters the lemniscal decussation. A scalp P14 peak is generated at this level. As conduction continues up the medial lemniscus to upper midbrain and into the thalamus, a scalp negative peak is detected, the N18. After synapsing in the thalamus and traversing the internal capsule, the N20 is recorded over the somatosensory cortex contralateral to the wrist stimulated, corresponding to arrival of the nerve impulses at the primary somatosensory region.

Posterior tibial nerve stimulation at the ankle gives rise to a similar series of subsequent peaks. An N8 potential can be detected over the posterior tibial nerve at the knee. An N22 potential can be detected over the upper lumbar spine, corresponding to the collateral activity as the sensory fibers synapse in the lumbar spinal cord. More rostrally, a cervical potential can occasionally be detected over the mid- or upper cervical spine. Finally, a P37 scalp potential is seen over the midline scalp lateral to the midsagittal plane, but ipsilateral to the leg stimulated.

== Functional sensitivity ==
=== Non-pathological factors ===
The effects of age on SEP latencies mainly reflect conduction slowing in the peripheral nerves evidenced by the increase of the N9 component after median nerve stimulation. Shorter central conduction times (CCT, the transit time of the ascending volley in the central segments of the somatosensory pathways) have also been reported in females as compared to males, and conduction velocities are also known to be affected by changes in limb temperature. It has always been assumed that cortical SEPs peaking before 50 ms following stimulation of the upper limb are not significantly affected by cognitive processes. However, Desmedt et al. (1983) identified a P40 potential in response to target stimuli in an oddball task, suggesting that attention-related processes could affect early cortical SEPs. Finally, some changes in the amplitude, waveform, and latency of the parietal N20 have been reported during natural sleep in normal subjects.

=== Pathological factors ===
Median and posterior tibial SEPs are used in a variety of clinical settings. They can detect, localize and quantify focal interruptions along the somatosensory pathways, which may be due to any number of focal neurological problems, including trauma, compression, multiple sclerosis, tumor or other focal lesions. SEPs are also sensitive to cortical attenuation due to diffuse central nervous system (CNS) disorders. This is seen in a variety of neurodegenerative disorders and metabolic problems such as vitamin B12 deficiency. When a patient suffers from sensory impairment, and when the clinical localization of the sensory impairment is unclear, SEPs can be helpful in distinguishing whether the sensory impairment is due to CNS problems as opposed to peripheral nervous system problems. Median nerve SEP is also helpful in predicting neurological sequelae following cardiac arrest: if the cortical N20 and subsequent components are completely absent 24 hours or more after the cardiac arrest, essentially all of the patients go on to die or have vegetative neurological sequelae.

== Clinical applications ==
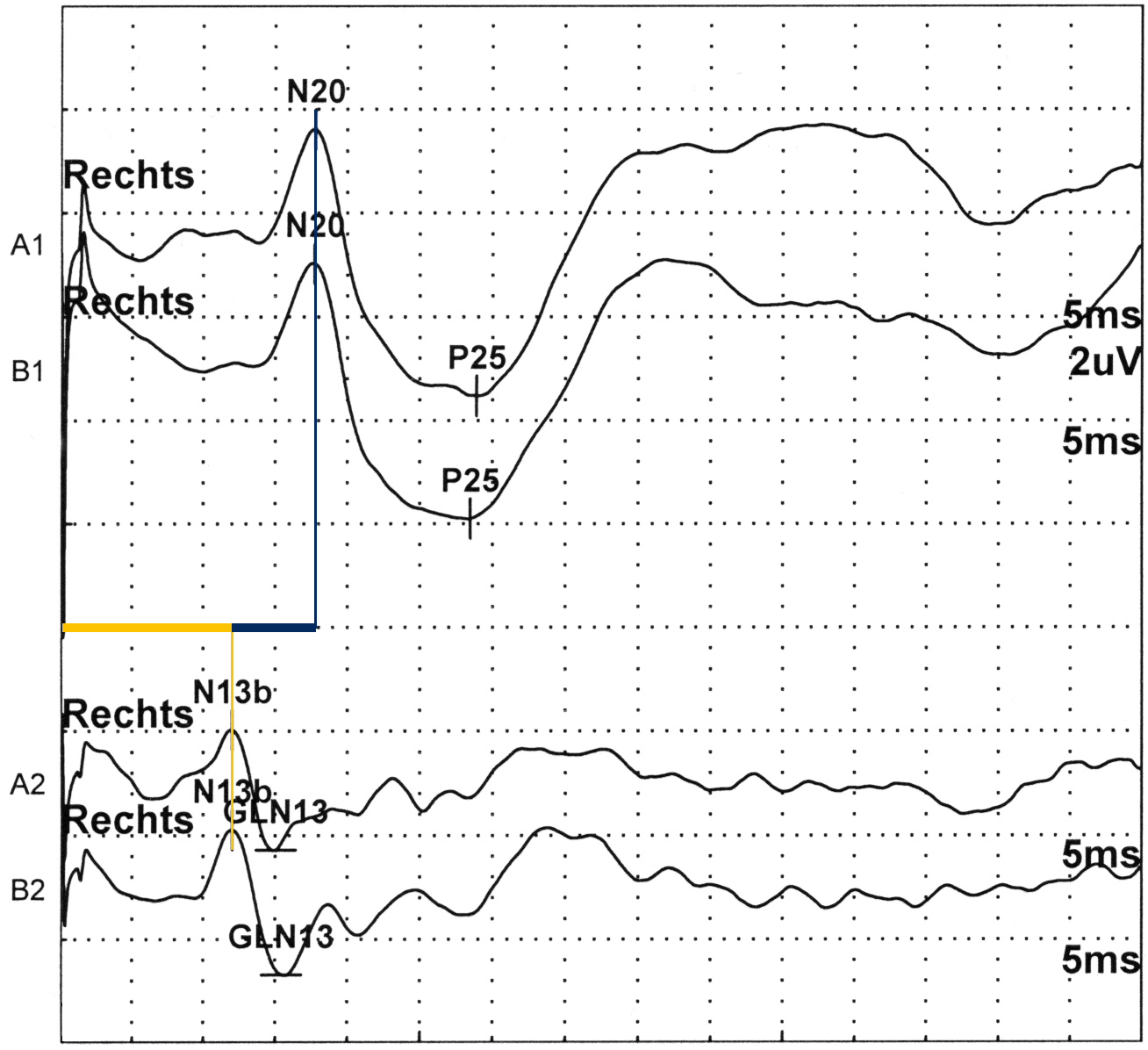
SEP recording of median nerve

In the recent decade, the clinical usefulness of SEPs entered the operating room, allowing the intraoperative monitoring of the CNS and, thus, safeguarding CNS structures during high risk surgeries. Continuous SEP monitoring can warn a surgeon and prompt intervention before impairment becomes permanent. Testing with median nerve SEPs is used to identify the sensory and motor cortex during craniotomies and in monitoring surgery at the midcervical or upper cervical levels. Posterior tibial nerve SEP monitoring is widely used for monitoring the spinal cord during scoliosis procedures and other surgical interventions in which the spinal cord is at risk for damage. Recording of far field intracranially generated peaks can facilitate monitoring even when the primary cortical peaks are impaired due to anesthetic agents. Over time, SEP testing and monitoring in surgery have become standard techniques widely used to reduce risk of postoperative neurologic problems for the patient. Continuous SEP monitoring can warn a surgeon about potential spinal cord damage, which can prompt intervention before impairment becomes permanent. Overall, SEPs can meet a variety of specific clinical objectives, including:

1. to establish objective evidence of abnormality when signs or symptoms are equivocal;
2. to look for clinically silent lesions;
3. to define an anatomical level of impairment along a pathway;
4. to provide evidence about the general category of the pathology;
5. to monitor objective changes in the patient's status over time.

== Experimental paradigms ==
Besides the clinical setting, SEPs have shown to be useful in distinct experimental paradigms. Schubert et al. (2006) used SEPs to investigate the differential processing of consciously perceived versus unperceived somatosensory stimuli. The authors used an 'extinction' paradigm to examine the connection between activation of S1 and somatosensory awareness, and observed that early SEPs (P60, N80), generated in the contralateral S1, were independent of stimulus perception. In contrast, amplitude enhancements were observed for the P100 and N140 for consciously perceived stimuli. The authors concluded that early activation of S1 is not sufficient to warrant conscious stimulus perception. Conscious stimulus processing differs significantly from unconscious processing starting around 100 ms after stimulus presentation when the signal is processed in parietal and frontal cortices, brain regions crucial for stimulus access into conscious perception. In another study, Iwadate et al. (2005) looked at the relationship between physical exercise and somatosensory processing using SEPs. The study compared SEPs in athletes (soccer players) and non-athletes, using two oddball tasks following separate somatosensory stimulation at the median nerve and at the tibial nerve. In the athlete group the N140 amplitudes were larger during upper- and lowerlimb tasks when compared to non-athletes. The authors concluded that plastic changes in somatosensory processing might be induced by performing physical exercises that require attention and skilled movements.

== See also ==
- Bereitschaftspotential
- C1 and P1
- Contingent negative variation
- Difference due to memory
- Early left anterior negativity
- Error-related negativity
- Late positive component
- Lateralized readiness potential
- Mismatch negativity
- N2pc
- N100
- N170
- N200
- N400
- P3a
- P3b
- P200
- P300 (neuroscience)
- P600
- Visual N1
