= Risto Näätänen =

Finnish psychologist (1939–2023)

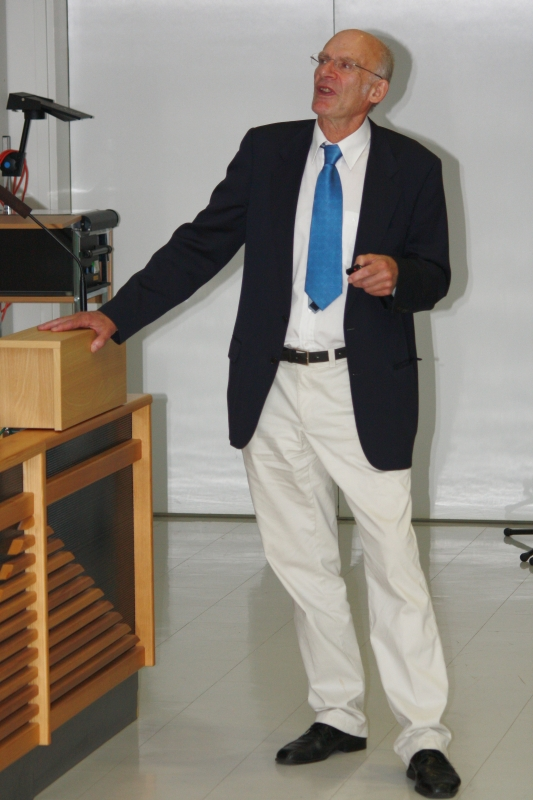
- Risto Näätänen in August 2009
- Born: Risto Kalervo Näätänen; 14 June 1939; Helsinki, Finland
- Died: October 5, 2023 (aged 84)
- Education: University of Helsinki
- Occupation: Scientist
- Organization(s): Royal Swedish Academy of Sciences; Finnish Academy of Science and Letters; Academia Europaea
- Awards: Finnish Science Award (1997)

Risto Kalervo Näätänen (14 June 1939 – 5 October 2023) was a Finnish psychological scientist, pioneer in the field of cognitive neuroscience, and known worldwide as one of the discoverers of the electrophysiological mismatch negativity. He was a much-cited social scientist and one of the few individuals appointed permanent Academy Professor of the Academy of Finland. He retired in 2007 and retained a title of Academy Professor emeritus of the Academy of Finland. He was a professor at the University of Tartu starting in 2007.

== Biography ==
=== Education ===
Näätänen started to study psychology in the University of Helsinki in 1958, training in cognitive electrophysiology at the laboratory of Donald B. Lindsley at the University of California, Los Angeles (1965–1966). Under Lindsley's supervision, he defended his doctoral dissertation about brain mechanisms of selective attention at the University of Helsinki in 1967. As early as that he started to influence the scientific world: in his thesis he refuted a then well-known experimental design and no works have ever been published using that design again.

=== Career ===
In 1975, at an age of 36, having published 13 academic articles, he was appointed a Professor of General Psychology at the University of Helsinki. In practice, he was at that department until 1999, but officially on leave from 1983, being salaried as an Academy Professor of The Academy of Finland. He was founder of the Cognitive Brain Research Unit (CBRU) at the University of Helsinki – a unit of which he was director from 1991 to 2006.

Näätänen retired in 2007, and a retirement symposium was held in his honor in 2008. He was a Professor of Cognitive Neuroscience at the University of Tartu, Estonia, Visiting Professor at the Centre of Functionally Integrative Neurosciences (CFIN) of the University of Århus, Denmark, retaining a tertiary affiliation at the University of Helsinki as of May 2014, and held the title of an Academy Professor emeritus of the Academy of Finland after retirement.

Näätänen sat on editorial boards and reviewed for specialist journals (e.g., Brain Research, International Journal of Psychophysiology, Journal of Cognitive Neuroscience, NeuroReport). He published articles from collaborations with thousands of researchers. As of June 2014, according to Google Scholar no collaborators were listed as co-authors and citations totalled 62182 (17578 since 2013) resulting in an h-index of 128 (64 since 2009), being amongst the 0.5% most-cited scientists still alive, the most-cited scientist in Finnish and Estonian history. Noteworthy was that Teuvo Kohonen also vied for the title of most-cited Finnish scientist.

=== Death ===
Risto Näätänen died from COVID-19, in October 2023, at the age of 84.

== Legacy ==
His life work revolved around the mismatch negativity (MMN) first revealed in collaboration with Anthony W.K. Gaillard, and Sirkka Mäntysalo in reinterpretion of the prior findings of an early selective attention effect – discovered by Steven Hillyard – as a consequence of experiments that were carried out in the Institute for Perception TNO, Soesterberg, Netherlands, in the summer of 1975, by Sirkka Mäntysalo. MMN was established as a scalp-negative component of the event-related potential or ERPs, as derived from recordings made electroencephalographically via electrodes attached to the scalp. MMN was shown to be elicited by deviant stimuli interspersed amongst a series of standards.

MMN influenced theories of language perception, together with studies of cognitive development and musical intelligence. Risto Näätänen was most interested in the clinical scope: abnormalities of MMN have been associated with alcoholism, psychosis in schizophrenia, Alzheimer's disease, Parkinson's disease, and dyslexia. Facets of MMN associated with the prediction of waking in comatose individuals – as was hailed as a breakthrough – yet MMN has remained a research tool and has not met criteria to determine clinical decisions about the continuation of life support.

Risto Näätänen's major societal impact was to influence Finnish traffic politics, his studies of traffic behavior – conducted during the presidency of Kekkonen – leading to the establishment of speed limits on Finnish roads. Reaching the age of 74 in 2013, he expressed hopes that MMN would be implemented in education.

== Publications ==
=== Books ===
- Road-User Behaviour and Traffic Accidents (1976)
- Attention and Brain Function (1992)
- Mismatch Negativity: A Probe to Auditory Perception and Cognition in Basic and Clinical Research (chapter in the Cognitive Electrophysiology of Mind and Brain, 2003)
- The Mismatch Negativity: A Window to the Brain (2019)

=== Most influential articles ===
- The N1 wave of the human electric and magnetic response to sound - a review and an analysis of the component structure (1987, Psychophysiology, 24(4), 375-425)
- Early selective-attention effect on evoked potential reinterpreted. (1978, Acta Psychologica, 42(4), 313-29)
- The role of attention in auditory information-processing as revealed by event-related potentials and other brain measures of cognitive function (1990, Behavioral and Brain Sciences, 13(2), 201-232)
- Language-specific phoneme representations revealed by electric and magnetic brain responses (1997, Nature, 385(6615), 432-434)

== Awards and recognition ==
- The Honorary Senior Research Fellow, Dundee University, Scotland (1979)
- The Purkinje Prize, Praha, Czechoslovakia (1988)
- Knight, First Class, of the Order of the White Rose of Finland (1990)
- The Main Prize of the Finnish Cultural Foundation (1990)
- The Traffic-Safety Prize of the Finnish Traffic-Safety Organization (1992)
- The Distinguished Contributions Award of the Society for Psychophysiological Research (SPR), Washington D.C., USA (1995)
- George Soros Professor of Psychology, University of Tartu, Estonia (1996)
- The First National Science Award of Finland, Ministry of Education, Finland (1997)
- Honorary Doctor of Psychology, University of Jyväskylä (2000)
- Honorary Doctor of Social Sciences, University of Tartu, Estonia (2000)
- The 20th Anniversary of IOP Award for Highly Exceptional and Prize-Worthy Contributions to Psychophysiology and Related Neurosciences (International Organization of Psychophysiology, Montreal, Canada, 2002)
- Fellow of the World Innovation Foundation, U.K. (2005)
- The Honoured Fellow, The Russian Society for BioPsychiatry (RSBP) and The Russian Neuroscience Society (RNS), Russia (2005)
- The Senior Prize of the Finnish Psychological Societies and Associations, Tampere, Finland (2006)
- Honorary Doctor of Cognitive Neuroscience, University of Barcelona, Catalonia, Spain (2007)
- Nordic Prize for research within Neurodevelopmental Disorders, Sweden (2007)
- Honorary Doctor of neurosciences, University of St. Petersburg (2008)
- Honorary Doctor, Faculty of Medicine, University of Helsinki, Helsinki, Finland (2010)
- The Grand Medal of the University of Tartu, Tartu, Estonia (2010)
- Association for Psychological Science, Fellow, Washington, DC, USA (2011)
- The Main Scientific Prize of the Finnish Academy of Science and Letters, Finland (2011)
- Commander of the Order of the Lion of Finland (2012)
- The Golden Medal of the Finnish Psychological Association, Finland (2012)
