= N2pc =

N2pc refers to an ERP component linked to selective attention. The N2pc appears over visual cortex contralateral to the location in space to which subjects are attending; if subjects pay attention to the left side of the visual field, the N2pc appears in the right hemisphere of the brain, and vice versa. This characteristic makes it a useful tool for directly measuring the general direction of a person's attention (either left or right) with fine-grained temporal resolution.

== History ==
Luck and Hillyard (1990) first observed the N2pc while seeking to document electrophysiological correlates of focused attention during visual search using ERPs. Subjects viewed arrays containing 4-12 items, one of which was a target on 50% of trials. Compared to the waveform over cortex ipsilateral to the target, experimenters observed a consistently greater negative deflection of the ERP waveform at approximately 200 ms after the stimulus at posterior sites (i.e., over visual cortex) contralateral to the side of the screen subjects attended.

The N2pc first received its name from Luck and Hillyard (1994), who named the component after its characteristic features. The "N" denotes a negative polarity; "2" describes its latency in the waveform (i.e., the second negative deflection, typically around 200 ms); and "pc" stands for "posterior-contralateral," as the component appears over posterior electrode sites contralateral to the direction of attention. The experimenters explored what factors would modulate the N2pc using a visual search paradigm in which subjects had to report the presence of a target object in a display (e.g., a green box or a horizontal bar). They confirmed that the N2pc appeared contralateral to attended stimuli, and furthermore found that it did not appear when subjects saw only one object at a time or had to spread their attention over all the items in the display. These data led the experimenters to believe the N2pc corresponds to a filtering process that occurs whenever people focus attention on one object while ignoring others.

== Component characteristics ==
The component's name, N2pc, abbreviates its characteristics. The component belongs to the family of N2 ERP components, a negative deflection in the ERP waveform at a latency of approximately 200-300 ms following a stimulus. The "pc" stands for "posterior-contralateral", describing the topographic distribution of the component. It appears as a greater negativity at posterior electrode sites contralateral to the attended side of the visual field relative to ipsilateral electrode sites. For example, when a person pays attention to something in the left side of the visual field, an N2pc appears as a greater negativity over the right posterior areas of the brain than the left. MEG has been used to localize the N2pc primarily to lateral extrastriate cortex and inferotemporal visual areas, such as V4.

== Classic paradigms and findings ==
The N2pc can be used flexibly in nearly any task in which one would like to study the direction and time course of selective attention. However, researchers have primarily used the N2pc in visual search paradigms to study the deployment of attention over time and test hypotheses of parallel and serial models of visual search.

The first experiments to investigate specifically the N2pc used a visual search paradigm in which subjects reported the presence or absence of a pre-defined target (e.g., a green rectangle) in a display containing one "oddball" stimulus that differed on a single feature from a uniform background of items (e.g., a green square among blue squares). The oddball stimuli would "pop out" and attract attention, but were not necessarily targets. As a result, experimenters knew where subjects directed attention, but could simultaneously manipulate factors orthogonal to the location of attention, such as low-level features or probability of the target appearing. The pop-out oddball would generate an N2pc, as it received focused attention, while stimulus characteristics modulated the amplitude and latency of the component.

Subsequent investigation into the N2pc manipulated the number of items in the array and found that a display with as few as two objects elicits the component. Because an object cannot "pop out" and attract attention in a two-item display, experimenters concluded that the N2pc must reflect top-down, controlled processes of directing attention. The same study also demonstrated that the N2pc does not only occur when attending to visual features, but semantic features as well. In one experiment, subjects had to respond to the words "left" and "right" while ignoring the color words "white" and "brown." Even in this case of semantically defined targets, subjects demonstrated an N2pc contralateral to the target word. Together, these results have provided strong evidence that the N2pc reflects the location of covert, consciously directed attention.

The prototypical visual search paradigm for eliciting an N2pc component has subjects attend and respond to a target stimulus to the left or right of fixation. Unlike regular visual search experiments, however, two major criteria most hold when attempting to measure N2pc response. First, the stimuli should be identical in all conditions, and the experimenter should only manipulate instructions for directing attention across conditions; this precludes the possibility that stimulus features drive ERP effects rather than focused attention. Second, the target should be easy to find, usually via "pop-out." The goal is to minimize the variability in search times and N2pc latency, resulting in a much clearer signal when the waveforms are averaged together over multiple trials.

An example experiment for eliciting the N2pc that follows the critical principles above might proceed as follows: Subjects see an array of upright and inverted T's. One T is red, and one T is green, but the rest are black (thus fulfilling the first criterion of easy-to-find targets). Subjects are told to attend to either the red T's or the green T's at the beginning of the experiment and report whether that letter is upright or inverted (thus fulfilling the second criterion that attention should not be confounded with stimulus characteristics). We should expect to see an N2pc contralateral to the side of the screen the attended letter appeared.

== Functional sensitivity ==
=== Amplitude ===
The N2pc is primarily sensitive to the directional focus of attention over time. However, research has found a variety of factors that modulate N2pc response. N2pc amplitude is sensitive to factors related to increasing demands on focused attention.

- When non-target stimuli closely resemble the target (e.g., when targets are defined by size, but the size difference between targets and distractors is very small), they elicit an N2pc of lower amplitude than a target stimulus
- When targets are defined by a conjunction of features (e.g., blue, horizontal bar) rather than a single feature (e.g., blue bar), they elicit a larger N2pc, which may reflect a greater demand on attention to identify the target.
- In a dual-task situation where subjects focus on a demanding primary task while performing target detection as a secondary task, the N2pc only appears in response to detecting targets defined by conjunctions of features. Again, the greater attentional demands of conjunction-based targets relative to feature-based targets may be responsible.
- N2pc amplitude increases as distractors appear closer to the target, which increases the need to focus on the target while filtering the distractors (but also see Mazza et al., 2009, who found conflicting results).
- When subjects have to indicate where a target is located, they exhibit a larger N2pc than when they simply have to report whether or not a target is present

=== Elimination ===
Certain experimental conditions can eliminate the N2pc entirely. These results have been used to argue for a spatial filtering hypothesis, which proposes that the N2pc reflects the process of ignoring task-irrelevant (i.e., non-target) stimuli.

Early investigations of the N2pc critically found that the component was sensitive to the presence of distractors, appearing only when distractors accompanied a target stimulus. Furthermore, N2pc amplitude increases with the number of distractors in the display.

The N2pc also disappears when targets in the visual search task are defined as "any oddball object" rather than by one or more specific features. Luck and Hillyard (1994) have argued that in this case, determining whether a given object is a target requires distributing attention over multiple objects in the array (and determining the common features) rather than filtering them. Consequently, the spatial filtering process is discouraged, and the N2pc therefore does not appear.

== Functional significance ==
The N2pc literature agrees on a few functional characteristics of the N2pc. First, the N2pc appears whenever a person focuses attention on an object. Second, it serves as a direct measure for the direction of focused attention, either to the left or right. Finally, the N2pc is generally believed to be tied to a spatial filtering hypothesis (see above: "Eliminating the N2pc"). The last point regarding the functional significance of the N2pc, however, has been challenged. Some have contested the spatial filtering hypothesis, arguing that the N2pc reflects an enhancement of task-relevant stimulus processing rather than a suppression of irrelevant stimuli.

Other work has explored further cognitive processes that could be linked to the N2pc. For instance, the classic visual search paradigm that elicits the N2pc could be broken down further into processes of shifting attention, and spatially based processing of non-target locations. When combining the visual search task with visual cues that drew attention to spatial locations in the display, experimenters found that while the N2pc may not reflect shifts of attention, it may still reflect processing of a location in space that may or may not contain a target.

== See also ==
- Bereitschaftspotential
- C1 and P1
- Contingent negative variation
- Difference due to memory
- Early left anterior negativity
- Error-related negativity
- Late positive component
- Lateralized readiness potential
- Mismatch negativity
- N100
- N170
- N400
- P3a
- P3b
- P200
- P300 (neuroscience)
- P600
- Somatosensory evoked potential
- Visual N1
