= Oddball paradigm =

Psychology research paradigm

The oddball paradigm is an experimental design used within psychology research. The oddball paradigm relies on the brain's sensitivity to rare deviant stimuli presented pseudo-randomly in a series of repeated standard stimuli. The oddball paradigm has a wide selection of stimulus types, including stimuli such as sound duration, frequency, intensity, phonetic features, complex music, or speech sequences. The reaction of the participant to this "oddball" stimulus is recorded.

In the classic Oddball paradigm, two types of stimuli affecting the same sensory channel are presented randomly within an experiment, with a significant difference in the probability of occurrence. The more frequently occurring stimulus is called the standard stimulus, which serves as the background of the entire experiment; the less frequent and sporadic stimulus is known as the deviant stimulus. Since the physical properties of the two stimuli are very similar, the deviant stimulus appears as a deviation from the frequently occurring standard stimulus, hence the names "standard stimulus" and "deviant stimulus." In the classic Oddball paradigm, the deviant stimulus typically has an occurrence probability of about 20%, while the standard stimulus has a probability of about 80%.

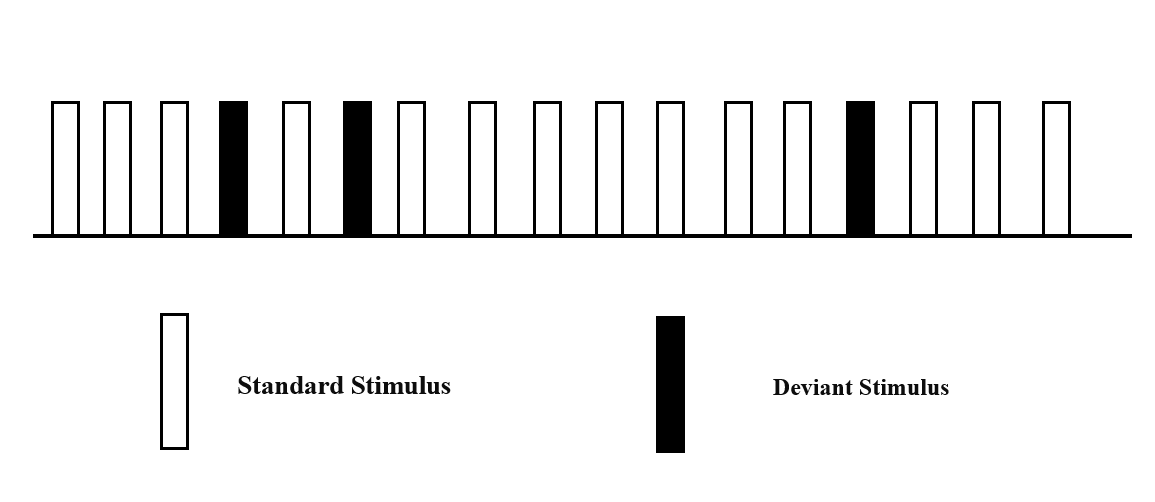
In the classical oddball paradigm, if participants are asked to respond to a deviant stimulus, the deviant stimulus is the target stimulus at that point.

== Subtypes ==
In the classic oddball paradigm, the participant's task is to detect the appearance of a target stimulus with a small probability. That is, they respond by pressing a key when a deviant stimulus appears, or by counting the number of deviant stimuli that appear. There are also some oddball paradigm subtypes that have been modified by researchers that are widely used.

(1) The two-choice oddball paradigm evolved from the classical oddball paradigm and was originally used in the study of mismatch negativity (MMN) and attention. The two-choice Oddball paradigm requires subjects to accurately and swiftly respond to briefly presented high-probability standard stimuli and low-probability deviant stimuli by making differentiated keypress responses within the presentation time of the stimuli.

(2) In a sequence where stimuli are regularly presented, the occasional omission of a stimulus can be utilized to investigate the evoked potentials. This paradigm is also applicable for studying the brain mechanisms of habituation under specific conditions of interest.

(3) The stimuli are categorized into three types: the high-probability stimulus, which serves as the standard stimulus and occurs approximately 70% of the time; and two types of deviant stimuli, each occurring 15% of the time. Subjects are required to respond only to one type of deviant stimulus. The stimulus to which subjects must respond is designated as the target stimulus, while the deviant stimulus that does not require a response is termed the non-target deviant stimulus. This paradigm facilitates the exploration of interactions between target and non-target stimuli under specified conditions of interest.

(4) This subtype further modifies (3) by changing one of the low-probability stimuli to novel stimuli. Novel stimuli are defined as a series of sudden, unexpected, and intense stimuli, each differing from the others, such as animal noises, horn sounds, or thunder. These novel stimuli are likely to provoke an orienting response in subjects and can trigger the P3a component, making this paradigm essential for studying involuntary attention.

== In ERP research ==
In 1975, the oddball paradigm was first used in event-related potential (ERP) research by Nancy Squires, Kenneth Squires and Steven A. Hillyard at the UC San Diego, although they did not name it. By 1976, the paradigm had been named.

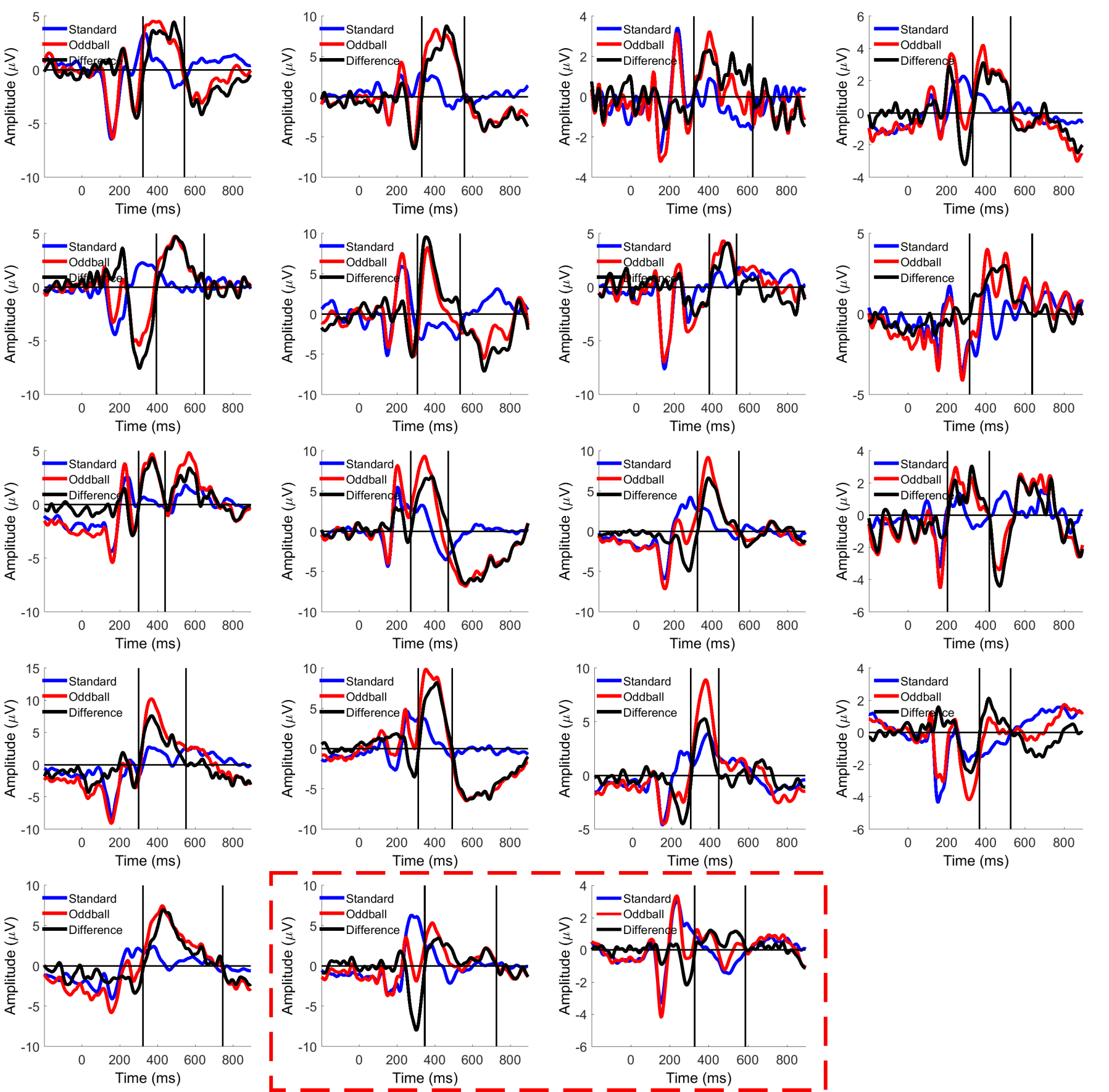
The P300 response of different healthy subjects in a two-tone auditory oddball paradigm. The plots show the average response to oddball (red) and standard (blue) trials and their difference (black). From Surprise response as a probe for compressed memory states. These examples show the significant individual variability in amplitude, latency and waveform shape across different subjects.

In ERP research it has been found that an event-related potential across the parieto-central area of the skull that usually occurs around 300 ms after stimuli presentation called P300 is larger after the target stimulus. The P300 wave only occurs if the subject is actively engaged in the task of detecting the targets. Its amplitude varies with the improbability of the targets. Its latency varies with the difficulty of discriminating the target stimulus from the standard stimuli.

Detection of these targets reliably evokes transient activity in prefrontal cortical regions. Measuring hemodynamic brain activity in the prefrontal cortex using functional magnetic resonance imaging (fMRI) revealed that the dorsolateral prefrontal cortex is associated with dynamic changes in the mapping of stimuli to responses (e.g. response strategies), independently of any changes in behavior.

Since P300 has been shown to be an attention-dependent cognitive component in wakefulness, one might suppose that it would be absent during sleep; a time in which information processing of external stimuli is commonly thought to be inhibited. Research to date indicates that P300 can be recorded during the transition to sleep and then reappears in REM sleep. Stimuli that are rare and intrusive are more likely to elicit the classic parietal P300 in REM sleep. There is, however, little or no positivity at frontal sites. This is consistent with brain imaging studies that show frontal deactivation is characteristic of REM sleep. These findings indicate that while sleepers may be able to detect stimulus deviance in stage 1 and REM, the frontal contribution to consciousness may be lost.

Studies of cognition often use an oddball paradigm to study effects of stimulus novelty and significance on information processing. However, an oddball tends to be perceptually more novel than the standard, repeated stimulus as well as more relevant to the ongoing task, making it difficult to disentangle effects due to perceptual novelty and stimulus significance. Evaluating different brain ERPs can decipher this effect. A frontro-central N2 component of ERP is primarily affected by perceptual novelty, whereas only the centro-parietal P3 component is modulated by both stimulus significance and novelty.

The classic auditory oddball paradigm can be modified to produce different neural responses and can therefore be used to investigate dysfunctions in sensory and cognitive processing in clinical samples.

A unique application of the oddball paradigm is being used heavily in Schizophrenia research to study the effects in neuronal generator patterns in continuous recognition memory, and the endophenotypes, which provide model on genetic relation of psychiatric diseases that represents phenotypes between manifest clinical syndrome and genetic underpinnings.

== Other uses ==
The oddball paradigm has been extended to use outside of ERP research.

The oddball paradigm has robust effects on pupil dilation that is produced by transient activity of the subcortical locus coeruleus. This pupil dilation effect is discussed to indicate a detection of stimulus salience and is expected to amplify the sensory processing of the salient stimulus by increased neural gain.

The perception of time seems to be modulated by our recent experiences. Humans typically overestimate the perceived duration of the initial event in a stream of identical events. Initial studies suggested that this oddball-induced "subjective time dilation" expanded the perceived duration of oddball stimuli by 30–50% but subsequent research has reported more modest expansion of around 10% or less, and the direction of the effect, whether the viewer perceives an increase or a decrease in duration, also seems to be dependent upon the stimulus used. New evidence shows that this effect may be influenced by predictive coding and perceptual differences between the oddball and the standard stimuli. Predictive coding posits that the brain anticipates incoming sensory information based on previous experiences; deviations from these predictions, as introduced by oddballs, result in larger prediction errors, enhancing the perceived duration of the oddball.

In infant research, the oddball paradigm is a technique that has been used to measure what infants expect. For example, in a still-face procedure, the mother suddenly adopts a neutral facial expression and stops responding to the infant's contingencies. By monitoring responses such as surprise reactions, crying or distress, suppressed motor activity, duration of gaze, amplitude and latency of brainwave components, and changes in heart rate, researchers can learn which stimuli are out of the ordinary for infants.
