= N100 =

Evoked potential in the brain

In neuroscience, the N100 or N1 is a large, negative-going evoked potential measured by electroencephalography (its equivalent in magnetoencephalography is the M100); it peaks in adults between 80 and 120 milliseconds after the onset of a stimulus, and is distributed mostly over the fronto-central region of the scalp. It is elicited by any unpredictable stimulus in the absence of task demands. It is often referred to with the following P200 evoked potential as the "N100-P200" or "N1-P2" complex. While most research focuses on auditory stimuli, the N100 also occurs for visual (see visual N1, including an illustration), olfactory, heat, pain, balance, respiration blocking, and somatosensory stimuli.

The auditory N100 is generated by a network of neural populations in the primary and association auditory cortices in the superior temporal gyrus in Heschl's gyrus and planum temporale. It also could be generated in the frontal and motor areas. The area generating it is larger in the right hemisphere than the left.

The N100 is preattentive and involved in perception because its amplitude is strongly dependent upon such things as the rise time of the onset of a sound, its loudness, interstimulus interval with other sounds, and the comparative frequency of a sound as its amplitude increases in proportion to how much a sound differs in frequency from a preceding one. Neuromagnetic research has linked it further to perception by finding that the auditory cortex has a tonotopic organization to N100. However, it also shows a link to a person's arousal and selective attention. N100 is decreased when a person controls the creation of auditory stimuli, such as their own voice.

== Types ==
There are three subtypes of adult auditory N100.

- N100b or vertex N100, peaking at 100 ms.
- T-complex N100a, largest at temporal electrodes at 75 ms
- T-complex N100c, follows N100a and peaks at about 130 ms. The two T-complex N100 evoked potentials are created by auditory association cortices in the superior temporal gyri.

== Elicitation ==
The N100 is often known as the "auditory N100" because it is elicited by perception of auditory stimuli. Specifically, it has been found to be sensitive to things such as the predictability of an auditory stimulus, and special features of speech sounds such as voice onset time.

=== During sleep ===
It occurs during both REM and NREM stages of sleep though its time is slightly delayed. During stage 2 NREM it seems responsible for the production of K-complexes. N100 is reduced following total sleep deprivation and this associates with an impaired ability to consolidate memories.

=== Stimulus repetition ===
The N100 depends upon unpredictability of stimulus: it is weaker when stimuli are repetitive, and stronger when they are random. When subjects are allowed to control stimuli, using a switch, the N100 may decrease. This effect has been linked to intelligence, as the N100 attenuation for self-controlled stimuli occurs the most strongly (i.e., the N100 shrinks the most) in individuals who are also evaluated as having high intelligence. Indeed, researchers have found that in those with Down syndrome "the amplitude of the self-evoked response actually exceeded that of the machine-evoked potential". Being warned about an upcoming stimulus also reduces its N100.

The amplitude of N100 shows refractoriness upon repetition of a stimulus; in other words, it decreases at first upon repeated presentations of the stimulus, but after a short period of silence it returns to its previous level. Paradoxically, at short repetition the second N100 is enhanced both for sound and somatosensory stimuli.

With paired clicks, the second N100 is reduced due to sensory gating.

=== Voice onset time ===
The difference between many consonants is their voice onset time (VOT), the interval between consonant release (onset) and the start of rhythmic vocal cord vibrations in the vowel. The voiced stop consonants /b/, /d/ and /g/ have a short VOT, and unvoiced stop consonants /p/, /t/ and /k/ long VOTs. The N100 plays a role in recognizing the difference and categorizing these sounds: speech stimuli with a short 0 to +30 ms voice onset time evoke a single N100 response but those with a longer (+30 ms and longer) evoked two N100 peaks and these are linked to the consonant release and vocal cord vibration onset.

== Top-down influences ==
Traditionally, 50 to 150 ms evoked potentials were considered too short to be influenced by top-down influences from the prefrontal cortex. However, it is now known that sensory input is processed by the occipital cortex by 56 ms and this is communicated to the dorsolateral frontal cortex where it arrives by 80 ms. Research also finds that the modulation effects upon N100 are affected by prefrontal cortex lesions. These higher-level areas create the attentive, repetition, and arousal modulations upon the sensory area processing reflected in N100.

Another top-down influence upon N100 has been suggested to be efference copies from a person's intended movements so that the stimulation that results from them are not processed. A person's own voice produces a reduced N100 as does the effect of a self-initiated compared to externally created perturbation upon balance.

== Development in children ==
The N100 is a slow-developing evoked potential. From one to four years of age, a positive evoked potential, P100, is the predominant peak. Older children start to develop a negative evoked potential at 200 ms that dominates evoked potentials until adolescence; this potential is identical to the adult N100 in scalp topography and elicitation, but with a much later onset. The magnetic M100 (measured by MEG rather than EEG) is, likewise, less robust in children than in adults. An adult-like N100-P200 complex only develops after 10 years of age.

The various types of N100 mature at different times. Their maturation also varies with the side of the brain: N100a in the left hemisphere is mature before three years of age but this does not happen in the right hemisphere until seven or eight years of age.

== Clinical use ==
The N100 may be used to test for abnormalities in the auditory system where verbal or behavioral responses cannot be used, such with individuals in coma; in such cases, it can help predict the probability of recovery. Another application is in assessing the optimal level of sedation in intensive critical care.

High density mapping of the location of the generators of M100 is being researched as a means of presurgical neuromapping needed for neurosurgery.

Many cognitive or other mental impairments are associated with changes in the N100 response, including the following:

- There is some evidence that the N100 is affected in those with dyslexia and specific language impairment.
- The sensory gating effect upon N100 with paired clicks is reduced in those with schizophrenia.
- In individuals with tinnitus, those with smaller N100 are less distressed than those with larger amplitudes.
- Migraine is associated with an increase rather than decrease in N100 amplitude with repetition of the high-intensity stimulation.
- Headache sufferers also have more reactive N100 to somatosensory input than nonsufferers

The N100 is 10 to 20% larger than normal when the auditory stimulus is synchronized with the diastolic phase of the cardiac blood pressure pulse.

== Relationship to mismatch negativity ==
The Mismatch negativity (MMN) is an evoked potential that occurs at roughly the same time as N100 in response to rare auditory events. It differs from the N100 in that:

- They are generated in different locations.
- The MMN occurs too late to be an N100.
- The MMN, unlike N100, may be elicited by stimulus omissions (i.e., not hearing a stimulus when you expect to hear one).

Though this suggests that they are separate processes, arguments have been made that this is not necessarily so and that they are created by the "relative activation of multiple cortical areas contributing to both of these 'components'".

== History ==
Pauline A. Davis at Harvard University first recorded the wave peak now identified with N100. The present use of the N1 to describe this peak originates in 1966 and N100 later in the mid 1970s. The origin of the wave for a long time was unknown and only linked to the auditory cortex in 1970.

Due to magnetoencephalography, research is increasingly done upon M100, the magnetic counterpart of the electroencephalographic N100. Unlike electrical fields which face the high resistance of the skull and generate secondary or volume currents, magnetic fields which are orthogonal to them have a homogeneous permeability through the skull. This enables the location of sources generating fields that are tangent to the head surface with an accuracy of a few millimeters. New techniques, such as event-related beam-forming with magnetoencephalography, allow sufficiently accurate location of M100 sources to be clinically useful for preparing surgery upon the brain.

== See also ==
- Bereitschaftspotential
- C1 and P1
- Contingent negative variation
- Difference due to memory
- Early left anterior negativity
- Error-related negativity
- Late positive component
- Lateralized readiness potential
- Mismatch negativity
- N2pc
- N170
- N200
- N400
- P3a
- P3b
- P200
- P300 (neuroscience)
- P600
- Somatosensory evoked potential
- Visual N1
