= Event-related potential =

Brain response that is the direct result of a specific sensory, cognitive, or motor event

A waveform showing several ERP components, including the N100 (labeled N1) and P300 (labeled P3). The ERP is plotted with negative voltages upward, a common, but not universal, practice in ERP research.

An event-related potential (ERP) is the measured brain response that is the direct result of a specific sensory, cognitive, or motor event. More formally, it is any stereotyped electrophysiological response to a stimulus. The study of the brain in this way provides a noninvasive means of evaluating brain functioning.

ERPs are measured by means of electroencephalography (EEG). The magnetoencephalography (MEG) equivalent of ERP is the ERF, or event-related field. Evoked potentials and induced potentials are subtypes of ERPs.

== History ==
With the discovery of the electroencephalogram (EEG) in 1924, Hans Berger revealed that one could measure the electrical activity of the human brain by placing electrodes on the scalp and amplifying the signal. Changes in voltage can then be plotted over a period of time. He observed that the voltages could be influenced by external events that stimulated the senses. The EEG proved to be a useful source in recording brain activity over the ensuing decades. However, it tended to be very difficult to assess the highly specific neural process that are the focus of cognitive neuroscience because using pure EEG data made it difficult to isolate individual neurocognitive processes. Event-related potentials (ERPs) offered a more sophisticated method of extracting more specific sensory, cognitive, and motor events by using simple averaging techniques. In 1935–1936, Pauline and Hallowell Davis recorded the first known ERPs on awake humans and their findings were published a few years later, in 1939. Due to World War II not much research was conducted in the 1940s, but research focusing on sensory issues picked back up again in the 1950s. In 1964, research by Grey Walter and colleagues began the modern era of ERP component discoveries when they reported the first cognitive ERP component, called the contingent negative variation (CNV). Sutton, Braren, and Zubin (1965) made another advancement with the discovery of the P3 component. Over the next fifteen years, ERP component research became increasingly popular. The 1980s, with the introduction of inexpensive computers, opened up a new door for cognitive neuroscience research. Currently, ERP is one of the most widely used methods in cognitive neuroscience research to study the physiological correlates of sensory, perceptual and cognitive activity associated with processing information.

== Calculation ==
ERPs can be reliably measured using electroencephalography (EEG), a procedure that measures electrical activity of the brain over time using electrodes placed on the scalp. The EEG reflects thousands of simultaneously ongoing brain processes. This means that the brain response to a single stimulus or event of interest is not usually visible in the EEG recording of a single trial. To see the brain's response to a stimulus, the experimenter must conduct many trials and average the results together, causing random brain activity to be averaged out and the relevant waveform to remain, called the ERP.

The random (background) brain activity together with other bio-signals (e.g., EOG, EMG, EKG) and electromagnetic interference (e.g., line noise, fluorescent lamps) constitute the noise contribution to the recorded ERP. This noise obscures the signal of interest, which is the sequence of underlying ERPs under study. From an engineering point of view it is possible to define the signal-to-noise ratio (SNR) of the recorded ERPs. Averaging increases the SNR of the recorded ERPs making them discernible and allowing for their interpretation. This has a simple mathematical explanation provided that some simplifying assumptions are made. These assumptions are:

1. The signal of interest is made of a sequence of event-locked ERPs with invariable latency and shape
2. The noise can be approximated by a zero-mean Gaussian random process of variance $\sigma^2$ which is uncorrelated between trials and not time-locked to the event (this assumption can be easily violated, for example in the case of a subject doing little tongue movements while mentally counting the targets in an experiment).

Having defined $k$, the trial number, and $t$, the time elapsed after the $k$^{th} event, each recorded trial can be written as $x(t,k)=s(t)+n(t,k)$ where $s(t)$ is the signal and $n(t,k)$ is the noise (Under the assumptions above, the signal does not depend on the specific trial while the noise does).

The average of $N$ trials is

$$\bar x(t) = \frac{1}{N} \sum_{k=1}^N x(t,k) = s(t) + \frac{1}{N} \sum_{k=1}^N n(t,k)$$.

The expected value of $\bar x(t)$ is (as hoped) the signal itself, $\operatorname{E}[\bar x(t)] = s(t)$.

Its variance is

$$\operatorname{Var}[\bar x(t)] = \operatorname{E}\left[\left(\bar x(t) - \operatorname{E}[\bar x(t)]\right)^2\right] = \frac{1}{N^2} \operatorname{E}\left[\left(\sum_{k=1}^N n(t,k)\right)^2\right] = \frac{1}{N^2} \sum_{k=1}^N \operatorname{E}\left[n(t,k)^2\right] = \frac{\sigma^2}{N}$$.

For this reason the noise amplitude of the average of $N$ trials is expected to deviate from the mean (which is $s(t)$) by less than or equal to $\sigma/{\sqrt{N}}$ in 68% of the cases. In particular, the deviation wherein 68% of the noise amplitudes lie is $1/{\sqrt{N}}$ times that of a single trial. A larger deviation of $2 \sigma/{\sqrt{N}}$ can already be expected to encompass 95% of all noise amplitudes.

Wide amplitude noise (such as eye blinks or movement artifacts) are often several orders of magnitude larger than the underlying ERPs. Therefore, trials containing such artifacts should be removed before averaging. Artifact rejection can be performed manually by visual inspection or using an automated procedure based on predefined fixed thresholds (limiting the maximum EEG amplitude or slope) or on time-varying thresholds derived from the statistics of the set of trials.

== Nomenclature ==
ERP waveforms consist of a series of positive and negative voltage deflections, which are related to a set of underlying components. Though some ERP components are referred to with acronyms (e.g., contingent negative variation – CNV, error-related negativity – ERN), most components are referred to by a letter (N/P) indicating polarity (negative/positive), followed by a number indicating either the latency in milliseconds or the component's ordinal position in the waveform. For instance, a negative-going peak that is the first substantial peak in the waveform and often occurs about 100 milliseconds after a stimulus is presented is often called the N100 (indicating its latency is 100 ms after the stimulus and that it is negative) or N1 (indicating that it is the first peak and is negative); it is often followed by a positive peak, usually called the P200 or P2. The stated latencies for ERP components are often quite variable, particularly so for the later components that are related to the cognitive processing of the stimulus. For example, the P300 component may exhibit a peak anywhere between 250 ms – 700 ms.

== Advantages and disadvantages ==
=== Relative to behavioral measures ===
Compared with behavioral procedures, ERPs provide a continuous measure of processing between a stimulus and a response, making it possible to determine which stage(s) are being affected by a specific experimental manipulation. Another advantage over behavioral measures is that they can provide a measure of processing of stimuli even when there is no behavioral change. However, because of the significantly small size of an ERP, it usually takes a large number of trials to accurately measure it correctly.

=== Relative to other neurophysiological measures ===
==== Invasiveness ====
Unlike microelectrodes, which require an electrode to be inserted into the brain, and PET scans that expose humans to radiation, ERPs use EEG, a non-invasive procedure.

==== Spatial and temporal resolution ====
ERPs provide excellent temporal resolution—as the speed of ERP recording is only constrained by the sampling rate that the recording equipment can feasibly support, whereas hemodynamic measures (such as fMRI, PET, and fNIRS) are inherently limited by the slow speed of the BOLD response. The spatial resolution of an ERP, however, is much poorer than that of hemodynamic methods—in fact, the location of ERP sources is an inverse problem that cannot be exactly solved, only estimated. Thus, ERPs are well suited to research questions about the speed of neural activity, and are less well suited to research questions about the location of such activity.

=== Cost ===
ERP research is much cheaper to do than other imaging techniques such as fMRI, PET, and MEG. This is because purchasing and maintaining an EEG system is less expensive than the other systems.

== Clinical ==
Physicians and neurologists will sometimes use a flashing visual checkerboard stimulus to test for any damage or trauma in the visual system. In a healthy person, this stimulus will elicit a strong response over the primary visual cortex located in the occipital lobe, in the back of the brain.

ERP component abnormalities in clinical research have been shown in neurological conditions such as:

- AD/HD
- Dementia
- Parkinson's disease
- Multiple sclerosis
- Head injuries
- Stroke
- Obsessive-compulsive disorder
- Schizophrenia
- Depression
- Autism spectrum disorder
- Epilepsy – to monitor the efficiency of cognitive processes

== Research ==
ERPs are used extensively in neuroscience, cognitive psychology, cognitive science, and psycho-physiological research. Experimental psychologists and neuroscientists have discovered many different stimuli that elicit reliable ERPs from participants. The timing of these responses is thought to provide a measure of the timing of the brain's communication or timing of information processing. For example, in the checkerboard paradigm described above, healthy participants' first response of the visual cortex is around 50–70 ms. This would seem to indicate that this is the amount of time it takes for the transduced visual stimulus to reach the cortex after light first enters the eye. Alternatively, the P300 response occurs at around 300ms in the oddball paradigm, for example, regardless of the type of stimulus presented: visual, tactile, auditory, olfactory, gustatory, etc. Because of this general invariance with regard to stimulus type, the P300 component is understood to reflect a higher cognitive response to unexpected and/or cognitively salient stimuli. The P300 response has also been studied in the context of information and memory detection. In addition, there are studies on abnormalities of P300 in depression. Depressed patients tend to have a reduced P200 and P300 amplitude and a prolonged P300 latency.

Due to the consistency of the P300 response to novel stimuli, a brain–computer interface can be constructed which relies on it. By arranging many signals in a grid, randomly flashing the rows of the grid as in the previous paradigm, and observing the P300 responses of a subject staring at the grid, the subject may communicate which stimulus he is looking at, and thus slowly "type" words.

Another area of research in the field of ERP lies in the efference copy. This predictive mechanism plays a central role in for example human verbalization. Efference copies, however, do not only occur with spoken words, but also with inner language - i.e. the quiet production of words - which has also been proven by event-related potentials.

Other ERPs used frequently in research, especially neurolinguistics research, include the ELAN, the N400, and the P600/SPS. The analysis of ERP data is also increasingly supported by machine learning algorithms.

ERPs combined with quantitative analysis of EEG signal frequencies have been proposed as a diagnostic tool for the early detection of cognitive decline.

=== Number of trials ===
A common issue in ERP studies is whether the observed data have a sufficient number of trials to support statistical analysis. The background noise in any ERP for any individual can vary. Therefore, simply characterizing the number of ERP trials needed for a robust component response is inadequate. ERP researchers can use metrics like the standardized measurement error (SME) to justify the examination of between-condition or between-group differences or estimates of internal consistency to justify the examination of individual differences.

== See also ==
- Bereitschaftspotential
- C1 and P1
- Contingent negative variation
- Difference due to memory
- Early left anterior negativity
- Erich Schröger
- Error-related negativity
- Evoked potential
- Induced activity
- Lateralized readiness potential
- Mismatch negativity
- Negativity: N100 • Visual N1 • N170 • N200 • N2pc • N400
- Positivity: P200 • P300 • P3a • P3b • Late positive component • P600
- Somatosensory evoked potential
