= Steven A. Hillyard =

American neuroscientist

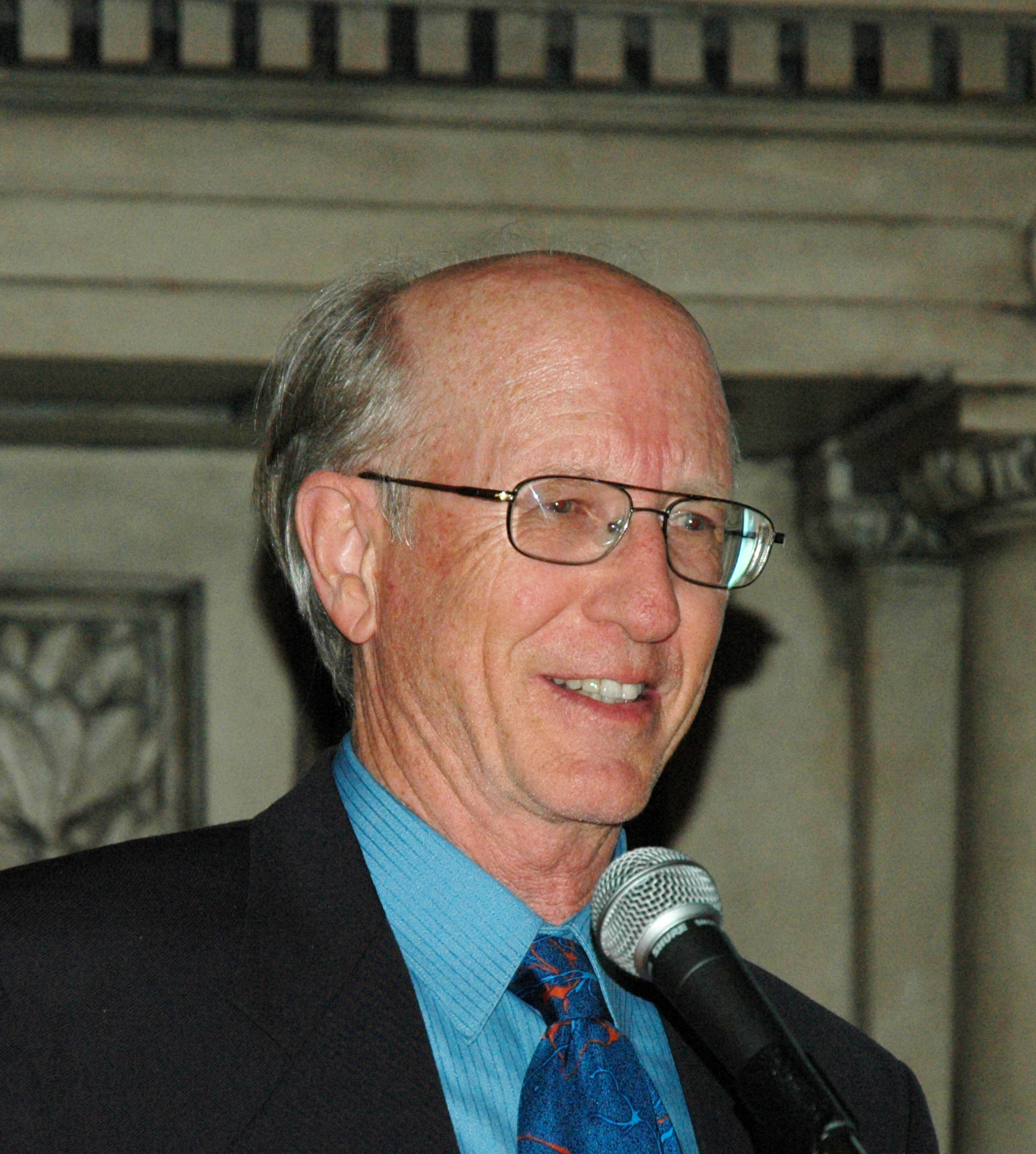
- Born: 1942 (age 83–84); California, USA
- Education: Caltech - Yale University
- Known for: Electrophysiology of selective attention
- Awards: Distinguished Contributions to Psychophysiology - American Academy of Arts and Sciences - George A. Miller Prize in Cognitive Neuroscience
- Scientific career
- Fields: Psychology Cognitive neuroscience Human electrophysiology
- Thesis: (1968)
- Doctoral advisor: Robert Galambos

Steven A. Hillyard (born in California in 1942) is an American cognitive neuroscientist and distinguished professor of neurosciences emeritus at the University of California, San Diego. He is well known for his use of human EEG and ERP recordings to investigate mechanisms of perception, attention, and cognition, and is widely considered a founder of human cognitive neurophysiology and cognitive neuroscience.

== Education and career ==
Hillyard received a B.S. in 1964 in Biology at the California Institute of Technology (Caltech) where he conducted research in the laboratory of Roger Sperry, before receiving his Ph.D. in psychology from Yale University in 1968 under mentorship from Robert Galambos. Thereafter he joined the faculty of the University of California, San Diego, in the Department of Neurosciences.

== Research ==
Hillyard's research began by investigating the contingent negative variation and hemispheric specialization in the brain. His seminal work on the neural mechanisms of auditory and visual selective attention demonstrated that early stages of cortical sensory processing are modulated by what a person attends or ignores. In 1980, Hillyard discovered, along with Marta Kutas, the N400 event related potential component that is an index of semantic processing in the human brain. In studies in split-brain patients with Michael Gazzaniga, he has also contributed much to our understanding of how the two hemispheres of the brain control attention and process language. Hillyard has over 280 publications which have received over 87,000 citations.

== Awards and honors (selected) ==
- 1985 - Fellow, American Association for the Advancement of Science (AAAS)
- 1990 - NIMH MERIT Award
- 1999 - Award for Distinguished Contributions to Psychophysiology, Society for Psychophysiological Research (SPR)
- 2006 - George A. Miller Prize in Cognitive Neuroscience, Cognitive Neuroscience Society (CNS)
- 2013 - Elected a Member of the American Academy of Arts & Sciences.
