= P300 (neuroscience) =

Event-related potential

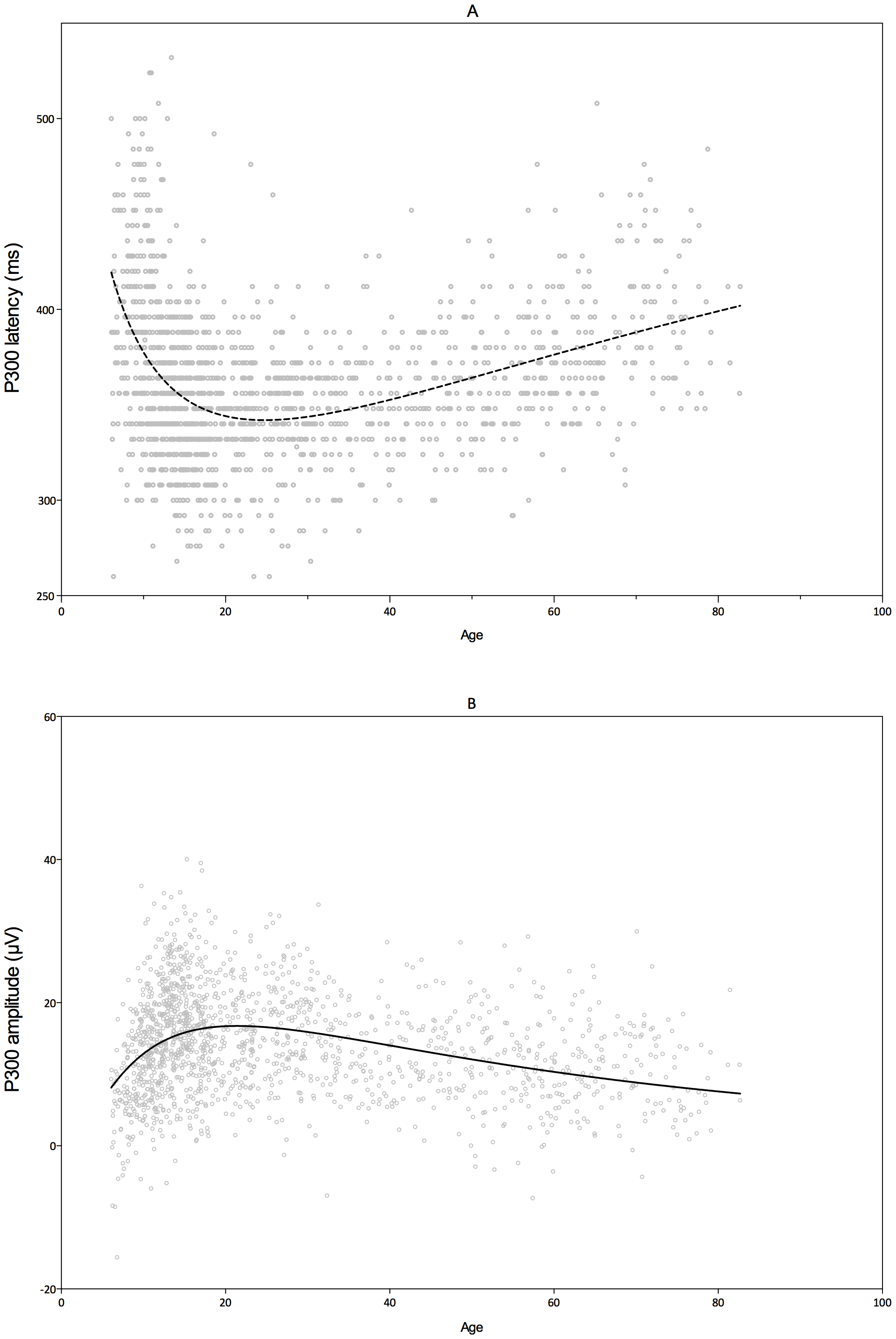
P300 latency and amplitude trajectories across the lifespan as obtained from the cross-sectional dataset. Dots represent scores from individual participants. From From P300 Development across the Lifespan: A Systematic Review and Meta-Analysis. The latency and amplitude of the P300 response may vary as a function of age.

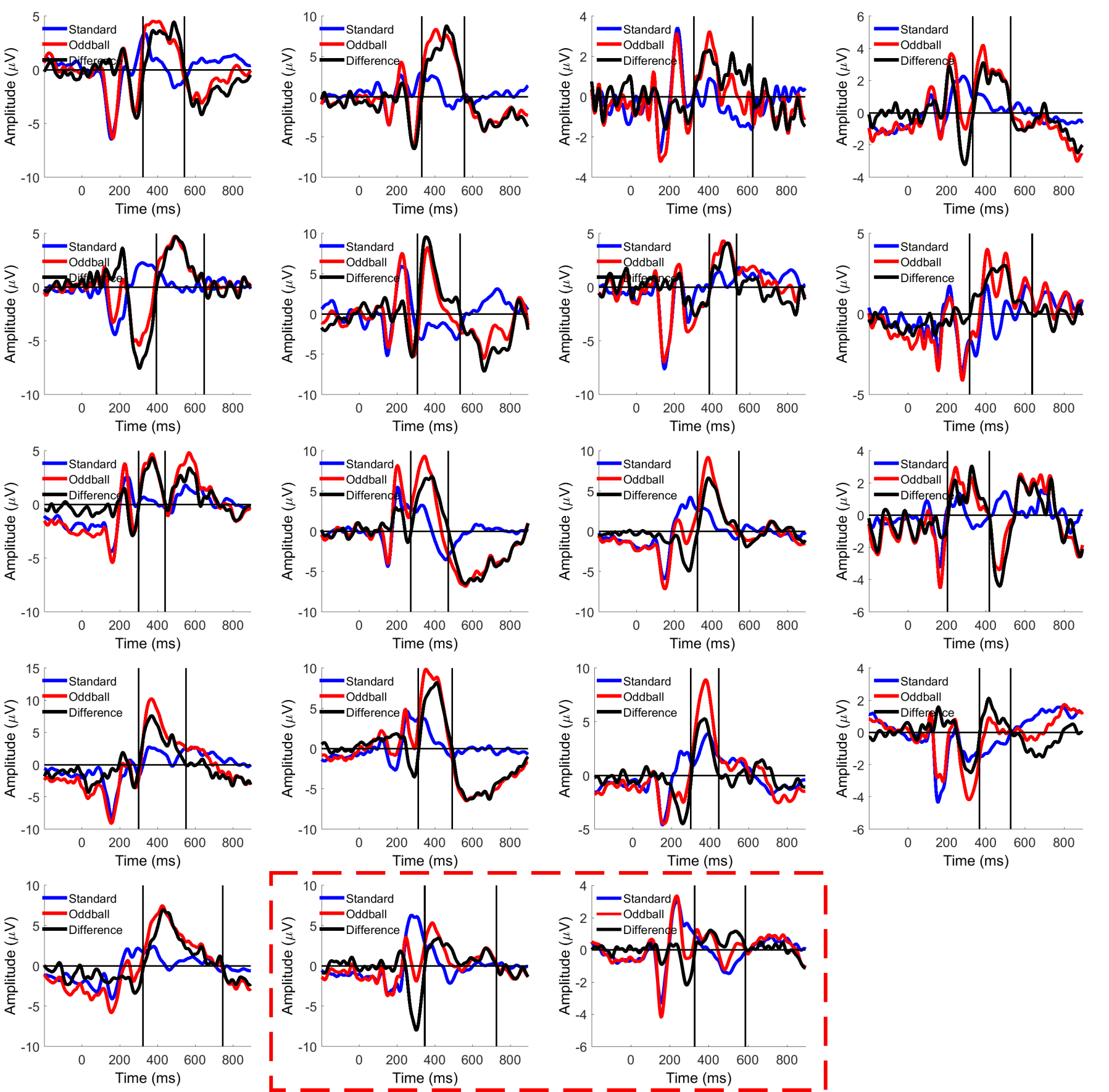
The P300 response of different healthy subjects in a two-tone auditory oddball paradigm at electrode Cz. The plots show the average response to oddball (red) and standard (blue) trials and their difference (black). From Surprise response as a probe for compressed memory states. These examples show the significant individual variability in amplitude, latency and waveform shape across different subjects.

In neuroscience, the P300 (P3) wave is an event-related potential (ERP) component elicited during decision making, commonly seen in electroencephalogram (EEG) recordings. It is considered an endogenous potential, as its occurrence links not to the physical attributes of a stimulus, but to a person's reaction to it. More specifically, the P300 is thought to reflect processes involved in stimulus evaluation or categorization.

It is usually elicited using the oddball paradigm, in which low-probability target items are mixed with high-probability non-target (or "standard") items. When recorded by EEG, it surfaces as a positive deflection in voltage with a latency (delay between stimulus and response) of roughly 250 to 500 ms. P3 is sometimes divided into the early window (300-400 ms) and late window (380-440 ms).

The signal is typically measured most strongly by the electrodes covering the parietal lobe. The presence, magnitude, topography and timing of this signal are often used as metrics of cognitive function in decision-making processes. While the neural substrates of this ERP component still remain hazy, the reproducibility and ubiquity of this signal makes it a common choice for psychological tests in both the clinic and laboratory.

== History ==
Early observations of the P300 (more specifically, the component that would later be named the P3b) were reported in the mid-1960s. In 1964, researchers Chapman and Bragdon found that ERP responses to visual stimuli differed depending on whether the stimuli had meaning or not. They showed subjects two kinds of visual stimuli: numbers and flashes of light. Subjects viewed these stimuli one at a time in a sequence. For every two numbers, the subjects were required to make simple decisions, such as telling which of the two numbers was numerically smaller or larger, which came first or second in the sequence, or whether they were equal. When examining evoked potentials to these stimuli (i.e., ERPs), Chapman and Bragdon found that both the numbers and the flashes elicited the expected sensory responses (e.g., visual N1 components), and that the amplitude of these responses varied in an expected fashion with the intensity of the stimuli. They also found that the ERP responses to the numbers, but not to the light flashes, contained a large positivity that peaked around 300 ms after the stimulus appeared. Chapman and Bragdon speculated that this differential response to the numbers, which came to be known as the P300 response, resulted from the fact that the numbers were meaningful to the participants, based on the task that they were asked to perform.

In 1965, Sutton and colleagues published results from two experiments that further explored this late positivity. They presented subjects with either a cue that indicated whether the following stimulus would be a click or a flash, or a cue which required subjects to guess whether the following stimulus would be a click or a flash. They found that when subjects were required to guess what the following stimulus would be, the amplitude of the "late positive complex" was larger than when they knew what the stimulus would be. In a second experiment, they presented two cue types. For one cue there was a 2 in 3 chance that the following stimulus would be a click and a 1 in 3 chance that the following stimulus would be a flash. The second cue type had probabilities that were the reverse of the first. They found that the amplitude of the positive complex was larger in response to the less probable stimuli, or the one that only had a 1 in 3 chance of appearing. Another important finding from these studies is that this late positive complex was observed for both the clicks and flashes, indicating that the physical type of the stimulus (auditory or visual) did not matter.

In later studies published in 1967, Sutton and colleagues had subjects guess whether they would hear one click or two clicks. They again observed a positivity around 300 ms after the second click occurred – or would have occurred, in the case of the single click. They also had subjects guess how long the interval between clicks might be, and in this case, the late positivity occurred 300 ms after the second click. This shows two important findings: first, that this late positivity occurred when uncertainty about the type of click was resolved, and second, that even an absence of a stimulus would elicit the late positive complex, if said stimulus was relevant to the task. These early studies encouraged the use of ERP methods to study cognition and provided a foundation for the extensive work on the P300 in the decades that followed.

In Alzheimer's disease, a prolongation of P300 wave latency and changes in the frequency of background EEG activity have been observed, and the use of a combined EEG–ERP methodology has been proposed for the assessment and early detection of cognitive decline.

== P3a and P3b ==
The P300 response as a function of the oddball probability. From Surprise response as a probe for compressed memory states. The ERP shows a larger P300 response magnitude to oddball stimuli and a lower P300 response to standard stimuli as the oddball probability decreases.

The P3a, or novelty P3, has a positive-going amplitude that displays maximum amplitude over frontal/central electrode sites and has a peak latency in the range of 250–280 ms. The P3a has been associated with brain activity related to the engagement of attention (especially the orienting, involuntary shifts to changes in the environment), and the processing of novelty.

The P3b has a positive-going amplitude (usually relative to a reference behind the ear or the average of two such references) that peaks at around 300 ms, and the peak will vary in latency from 250 to 500 ms or more, depending upon the task and the individual subject response. Amplitudes are typically highest on the scalp over parietal brain areas. The P3b has been a prominent tool used to study cognitive processes, especially psychology research on information processing. Generally speaking, improbable events will elicit a P3b, and the less probable the event, the larger the P3b amplitude. This was shown to be true both for the overall probability and for the local probability. However, in order to elicit a P3b, the improbable event must be related to the task at hand in some way (for example, the improbable event could be an infrequent target letter in a stream of letters, to which a subject might respond with a button press). The P3b can also be used to measure how demanding a task is on cognitive workload.

Since the initial discovery of the P300, research has shown that the P300 has two subcomponents. The subcomponents are the novelty P3, or P3a, and the classic P300, which has since been renamed P3b.

== Applications ==
Since the mid-1980s, one of the most discussed uses of ERPs such as the P300 is related to lie detection. In a proposed "guilty knowledge test" a subject is interrogated via the oddball paradigm much as they would be in a typical lie-detector situation. This practice has recently enjoyed increased legal permissibility while conventional polygraphy has seen its use diminish, in part owing to the unconscious and uncontrollable aspects of the P300. The technique relies on reproducible elicitation of the P300 wave, central to the idea of a Memory and Encoding Related Multifaceted Electroencephalographic Response (MERMER) developed by Dr. Lawrence Farwell.

Applications in brain-computer interfacing (BCI) have also been proposed. The P300 has a number of desirable qualities that aid in implementation of such systems. First, the waveform is consistently detectable and is elicited in response to precise stimuli. The P300 waveform can also be evoked in nearly all subjects with little variation in measurement techniques, which may help simplify interface designs and permit greater usability. The speed at which an interface is able to operate depends on how detectable the signal is despite "noise." One negative characteristic of the P300 is that the amplitude of the waveform requires averaging of multiple recordings to isolate the signal. This and other post-recording processing steps determine the overall speed of an interface. The algorithm proposed by Farwell and Donchin provides an example of a simple BCI that relies on the unconscious decision making processes of the P300 to drive a computer. A 6×6 grid of characters is presented to the subject, and various columns or rows are highlighted. When a column or row contains the character a subject desires to communicate, the P300 response is elicited (since this character is "special" it is the target stimulus described in the typical oddball paradigm). The combination of the row and column which evoked the response locates the desired character. A number of such trials must be averaged to clear noise from the EEG. The speed of the highlighting determines the number of characters processed per minute. Results from studies using this setup show that normal subjects could achieve a 95% success rate at 3.4–4.3 chars/min. Such success rates are not limited to non-disabled users; a study conducted in 2000 revealed that 4 paralyzed participants (one with complete paraplegia, three with incomplete paraplegia) performed as successfully as 10 normal participants.

Scientific research often relies on measurement of the P300 to examine event related potentials, especially with regard to decision making. Because cognitive impairment is often correlated with modifications in the P300, the waveform can be used as a measure for the efficacy of various treatments on cognitive function. Some have suggested its use as a clinical marker for precisely these reasons. There is a broad range of uses for the P300 in clinical research.

Some research groups have performed fMRI combined to EEG in order to achieve inner-speech dictation and the approach of inner-speech recognition.

The P300 wave obtained by visual stimulation is used to assess cognitive processes in humans, and the value of the latency and amplitude of the P300 wave can be a measure of the severity of dementia processes. The analysis of P300 wave latency seems to be particularly useful in the diagnosis of mild cognitive impairment (MCI).

== See also ==
- Error-related negativity
- Lateralized readiness potential
