= Specificity =

Specificity may refer to:

- Being specific (disambiguation)
- Specificity (statistics), the proportion of negatives in a binary classification test which are correctly identified
- Sensitivity and specificity, in relation to medical diagnostics
- Specificity (linguistics), whether a noun phrase has a particular referent as opposed to referring to any member of a class
- Specificity (symbiosis), the taxonomic range an organism associates with in a symbiosis
- Particular, as opposed to abstract, in philosophy
- Asset specificity, the extent that investments supporting a particular transaction have a higher value than if they were redeployed for any other purpose
- Domain specificity, theory that many aspects of cognition are supported by specialized learning devices
- Specificity theory, theory that pain is "a specific sensation, with its own sensory apparatus independent of touch and other senses"
- Cascading Style Sheets § Specificity, a principle used to determine the priority order of styles applied to HTML elements
- Chemical specificity, in chemistry and biochemistry, with regard to enzymes or catalysts and their substrates

== See also ==
- Species (disambiguation)
- Specification (disambiguation)
- Specialty (disambiguation)
- Site-specific (disambiguation)
- Language for specific purposes
