= Specific =

Specific may refer to:

- Specificity (disambiguation)
- Specific, a cure or therapy for a specific illness

== Law ==
- Specific deterrence, aimed at an individual
- Specific finding, intermediate verdict used by a jury in determining the final verdict
- Specific jurisdiction over an out-of-state party, specific to cases that have a substantial connection to the party's in-state activity
- Order of specific performance, court order to perform a specific act

=== Economics, finance, and accounting ===
- Asset specificity, the extent to which the investments made to support a particular transaction have a higher value to that transaction than they would have if they were redeployed for any other purpose
- Specific identification (inventories), summing purchase costs of all inventory items
- Specific rate duty, duty paid at a specific amount per unit
- Specific risk, risk that affects a very small number of assets

== Psychology ==
- Domain specificity, theory that many aspects of cognition are supported by specialized, presumably evolutionarily specified, learning devices
- Specific developmental disorder, disorders in which development is delayed in one specific area or areas, and in which basically all other areas of development are not affected
- Specific learning disability
- Specific phobia, phobia of a specific thing or situation
  - Specific social phobia, triggered only by specific social situations

== Biology ==
- pertaining to a species
  - Specific name (botany), species name of a plant
  - Specific name (zoology), species name of an animal
- Specific appetite, drive to eat foods with specific flavors or other characteristics
- Specific granule, secretory vesicle in granulocytes
- Specific immunity, to a particular pathogen
- Specific Pathogen Free, of a laboratory animal guaranteed free of particular (i.e., specific and named) pathogens

== Other fields ==
- A specific quantity generally means a physical quantity normalized "per unit" of something (often mass).
- SPECIFIC, The Sustainable Product Engineering Centre for Innovative Functional Industrial Coatings
- Specific creation, creationism as opposed to evolution
- Specific interval, shortest possible clockwise distance between pitch classes on the chromatic circle
- Specific integral, in calculus, eliminates the constant of integration
- Specific Physical Preparedness, being prepared for the movements in a specific physical activity (usually a sport)

== See also ==
- Species (disambiguation)
- Specification (disambiguation)
- Specialty (disambiguation)
- Site-specific (disambiguation)
- Language for specific purposes, has been primarily used to refer to two areas within applied linguistics
