= Pain theories =

Pain theories is an overview of the history of pain perception from the Middle Ages to the early modern period. It emphasizes how malleable an individual's perception of pain can be due to factors such as situation, visual perception, and previous history with pain. Humans have proposed rationales for its existence and sought soothing agents to dull or cease painful sensations, as long as they have experienced it.

Archaeologists have uncovered clay tablets dating back as far as 5,000 BC, which reference the cultivation and use of the opium poppy to bring joy and ease the pain. The Greek writer Homer's The Odyssey, written in 800 BC, features the character of Telemachus using opium to soothe his pain and forget his worries. While some cultures researched analgesics and allowed or encouraged their use, others perceived pain as a necessary, integral sensation. Physicians of the 19th century used pain as a diagnostic tool, theorizing that a greater amount of personally perceived pain was correlated to greater internal vitality and as a treatment in and of itself, inflicting pain on their patients to rid them of evil and unbalanced humors.

== Historical theories ==
=== Early theories ===
Bust of Aristotle

Because of the only relatively recent discovery of neurons and how they conduct and interpret signals, including sensations such as pain, within the body, various theories have been proposed regarding the causes of pain and its role or function. Even within seemingly limited groups, such as the ancient Greeks, there were competing theories about the root cause of pain. Aristotle did not include a sense of pain when he enumerated the five senses; he, like Plato before him, saw pain and pleasure not as sensations but as emotions ("passions of the soul"). Alternatively, Hippocrates believed that an imbalance in the vital fluids caused individuals' pain. At this time, Aristotle did not believe that the brain had any role in pain processing but instead implicated the heart as the central organ for the sensation of pain. He was the principal advocate of the cardio-centric theory of the soul and differed in this from the encephalo-centric proposals of, among others, Hippocrates, who explicitly considered that the brain was the source of "our pains, grief, anxieties and tears" (Hippocrates, in: W.H.S. Jones (Ed.), The Sacred Disease, vol. 2, The Loeb Classical Library, Cambridge, 1923). The dichotomy between encephalocentrists and cardiocentrists extended well into the Renaissance, the Aristotelic cardio-centric vision being the one that prevailed among philosophers, although disputed by eminent doctors such as Galen (Crivellato E, Ribatti D. Soul, mind, brain: Greek philosophy and the birth of neuroscience. Brain Research Bulletin 71 (2007) 327–336).

=== Middle Ages and Early Modern Period ===
In the 11th century, Avicenna theorized that there were a number of feeling senses, including touch, pain and titillation.

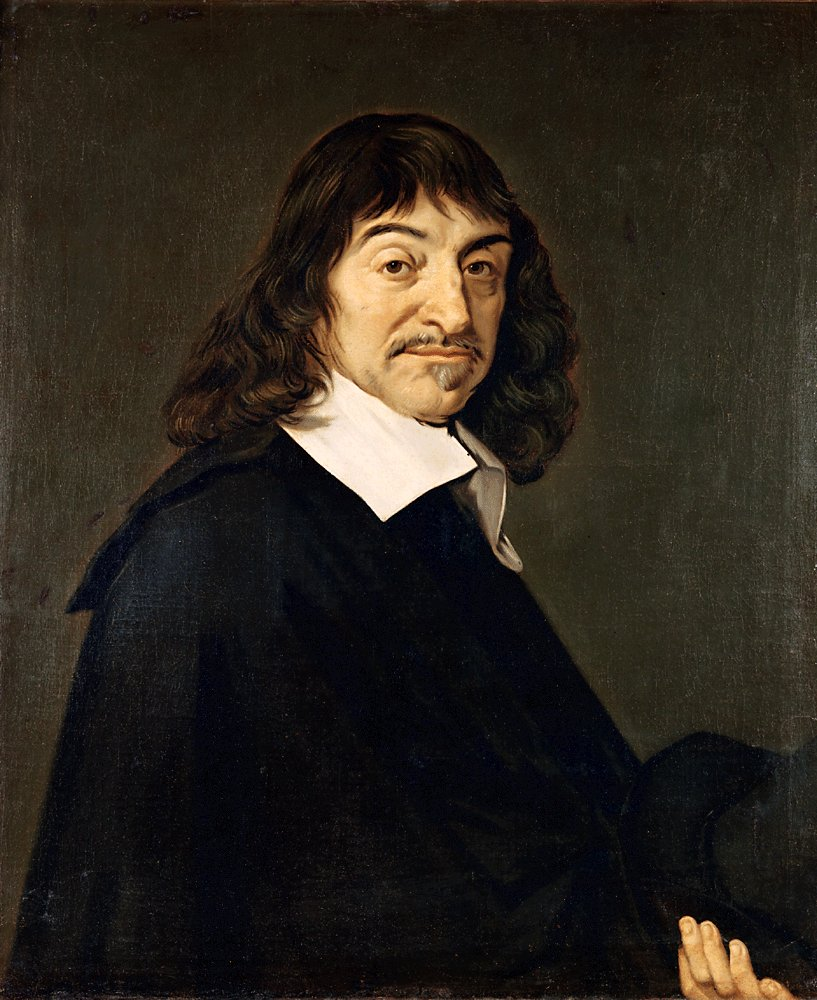
Portrait of René Descartes

In a religious context, pain was seen as a punishment or a trial from God. Still, the prominence of the religious conception did not prevent early modern physicians from being concerned by the suffering of their patients. They tried to manage it with early painkillers called anodynes and discussed the problem of what would later be named phantom limb pain, the latter of which was described in the 16th century by the surgeon Ambroise Paré. They proposed detailed descriptions of the signs of pain.

In his Treatise of Man (published posthumously in 1664), René Descartes theorized that the body was similar to a machine and that pain was a disturbance that passed down along nerve fibers until the disturbance reached the brain. His theory transformed pain perception from a spiritual experience to a physical, mechanical sensation, meaning treatments could be discovered by researching and locating pain fibers within the body.

=== Specificity theory ===
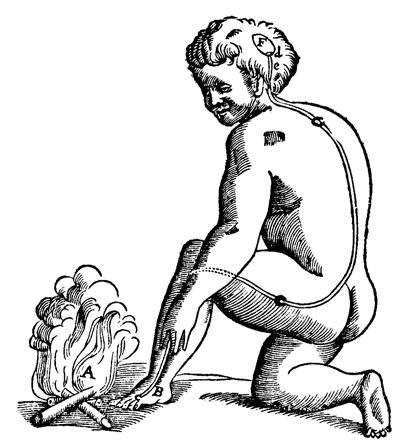
Descartes' pain pathway: "Particles of heat" (A) activate a spot of skin (B) attached by a fine thread (cc) to a valve in the brain (de) where this activity opens the valve, allowing the animal spirits to flow from a cavity (F) into the muscles causing them to flinch from the stimulus, turn the head and eyes toward the affected body part, and move the hand and turn the body protectively.

The specificity theory, which states that pain is "a specific sensation, with its own sensory apparatus independent of touch and other senses," emerged in the nineteenth century, having been prefigured by the work of Avicenna and Descartes.

Scottish anatomist Charles Bell proposed in 1811 that there exist different kinds of sensory receptor, each adapted to respond to only one stimulus type. In 1839, Johannes Peter Müller established that a single type of stimulus—such as a blow or an electric current—can produce different sensations depending on the specific nerve that is stimulated. He hypothesized that each of the five types of nerves associated with Aristotle's five senses has a unique "specific energy." According to his theory, it is this specific type of energy that determines the sensation produced by each nerve. He considered sensations such as itching, pleasure, pain, heat, cold, and touch to be varieties of the single sense he called "feeling and touch." Müller's hypothesis neutralized the ancient idea that nerves carry actual properties or incorporeal copies of the perceived object, marking the beginning of the modern era of sensory psychology and prompting others to ask, "Do the nerves that evoke the different qualities of touch and feeling have specific characteristics?"

Filippo Pacini had isolated receptors in the nervous system that detect pressure and vibrations in 1831. Georg Meissner and Rudolf Wagner described receptors sensitive to light touch in 1852, and Wilhelm Krause found a receptor that responds to gentle vibration in 1860. Moritz Schiff was first to definitively formulate the specificity theory of pain when, in 1858, he demonstrated that touch and pain sensations traveled to the brain along separate spinal cord pathways. In 1882, Magnus Blix reported that specific spots on the skin elicit sensations of either cold or heat when stimulated and proposed that "the different sensations of cool and warm are caused by stimulation of different, specific receptors in the skin." Maximilian von Frey found and described these heat and cold receptors and, in 1896, reported finding "pain spots" on the skin of human subjects. Von Frey proposed there are low threshold cutaneous spots that elicit the feeling of touch and high threshold spots that elicit pain, and that pain is a distinct cutaneous sensation, independent of touch, heat and cold, and associated with free nerve endings.

=== Intensive theory ===
In the first volume of his 1794 Zoonomia; or the Laws of Organic Life, Erasmus Darwin bolstered the idea previously advanced in Plato's Timaeus: that pain is not a unique sensory modality, but an emotional state produced by stronger than normal stimuli such as intense light, pressure or temperature. Wilhelm Heinrich Erb, in 1874, also argued that any sensory stimulus can generate pain, provided it is intense enough, and his formulation of the hypothesis became known as the intensive theory.

Alfred Goldscheider (1884) confirmed the existence of distinct heat and cold sensors by evoking heat and cold sensations using a fine needle to penetrate and electrically stimulate different nerve trunks, bypassing their receptors. Although he failed to find specific pain-sensitive spots on the skin, Goldscheider concluded in 1895 that the available evidence supported pain specificity, holding the view until a series of experiments were conducted in 1889 by Bernhard Naunyn. Naunyn rapidly stimulated (60–600 times/second) the skin of patients with tabes dorsalis below their touch threshold (using a hair), and within 6 to 20 seconds, this produced unbearable pain. He obtained similar results using other stimuli, including electricity, to deliver rapid, sub-threshold stimulation and concluded pain is the product of summation. In 1894, Goldscheider extended the intensive theory, proposing that each tactile nerve fiber can evoke three distinct qualities of sensation—tickle, touch, and pain—of quality dependent on the intensity of stimulation. He extended Naunyn's summation concept, proposing that, over time, activity from peripheral fibers may accumulate in the posterior horn of spinal cord and "spill over" from the peripheral fiber to a pain-signalling spinal fiber once some threshold of activity has been crossed. The British psychologist Edward B. Titchener pronounced, in his 1896 textbook, that "excessive stimulation of any sense organ or direct injury to any sensory nerve occasions the common sensation of pain."

=== Competing theories ===
By the mid-1890s, specificity was mainly backed by physiologists (most prominently by von Frey) and clinicians; intensive theory received the most support from psychologists. After Henry Head in England published a series of clinical observations between 1893 and 1896, and von Frey conducted experiments between 1894 and 1897, the psychologists migrated to specificity almost en masse. By the century's end, most physiology and psychology textbooks presented pain specificity as fact, with Titchener, in 1898, placing "the sensation of pain" alongside that of pressure, heat, and cold. Although the intensive theory is no longer featured prominently in textbooks, Goldscheider's elaboration nevertheless stands its ground in opposition to von Frey's specificity, retaining support by some influential theorists well into the mid-twentieth century.

In 1943, William Kenneth Livingston proposed a summation theory suggesting that high-intensity pain signals from damaged nerves or tissue create a self-exciting activity loop among spinal interneurons. When activity reaches a threshold, these interneurons activate "transmission" cells that send pain signals to the brain. This activity also influences other spinal cord cells, triggering the sympathetic nervous system and somatic motor responses, while emotions like fear further perpetuate the interneuron activity. Ralph W. Gerard made a similar proposal in 1951, arguing that intense peripheral nerve signalling may cause temporary failure of inhibition in spinal cord neurons, allowing them to fire as synchronized pools, with signal volleys strong enough to activate the pain mechanism.

=== Pattern theory ===
Building on John Paul Nafe's 1934 suggestion that different cutaneous qualities are the product of different temporal and spatial patterns of stimulation and ignoring a large body of strong evidence for receptor fiber specificity, DC Sinclair and G Weddell's 1955 "peripheral pattern theory" proposed that all skin fiber endings (except those innervating hair cells) are identical, and that pain is produced by intense stimulation of these fibers. In 1953, Willem Noordenbos observed that a signal carried from the area of injury along large diameter "touch, pressure or vibration" fibers may inhibit the signal carried by the thinner "pain" fibers—the ratio of large fiber signal to thin fiber signal determining pain intensity. This was taken as a demonstration that a pattern of stimulation (of large and thin fibers in this instance) modulates pain intensity.

=== Gate control theory ===
Ronald Melzack and Patrick David Wall introduced their "gate control" theory of pain in the 1965 Science article "Pain Mechanisms: A New Theory". The authors proposed that both thin (pain) and large diameter (touch, pressure, vibration) nerve fibers carry information from the site of injury to two destinations in the dorsal horn of the spinal cord: transmission cells that carry the pain signal up to the brain, and inhibitory interneurons that impede transmission cell activity. Activity in both thin and large diameter fibers excites transmission cells. Thin fiber activity impedes the inhibitory cells (tending to allow the transmission cell to fire), and large diameter fiber activity excites the inhibitory cells (tending to inhibit transmission cell activity). So, the more large fiber (touch, pressure, vibration) activity relative to thin fiber activity at the inhibitory cell, the less pain is felt. The authors had drawn a neural "circuit diagram" to explain why we rub a smack. They pictured not only a signal traveling from the site of injury to the inhibitory and transmission cells and up the spinal cord to the brain but also a signal traveling from the site of injury directly up the cord to the brain (bypassing the inhibitory and transmission cells) where, depending on the state of the brain, it may trigger a signal back down the spinal cord to modulate inhibitory cell activity (and so pain intensity). The theory offered a physiological explanation for the previously observed effect of psychology on pain perception.

== Modern theories ==
=== A biopsychosocial phenomenon ===
In 1975, the International Association for the Study of Pain sought a consensus definition for pain, finalizing "an unpleasant sensory and emotional experience associated with actual or potential tissue damage, or described in terms of such damage" as the final definition. It is clear from this definition that while it is understood that pain is a physical phenomenon, the emotional state of a person, as well as the context or situation associated with the pain also impacts the perception of the nociceptive or noxious event.

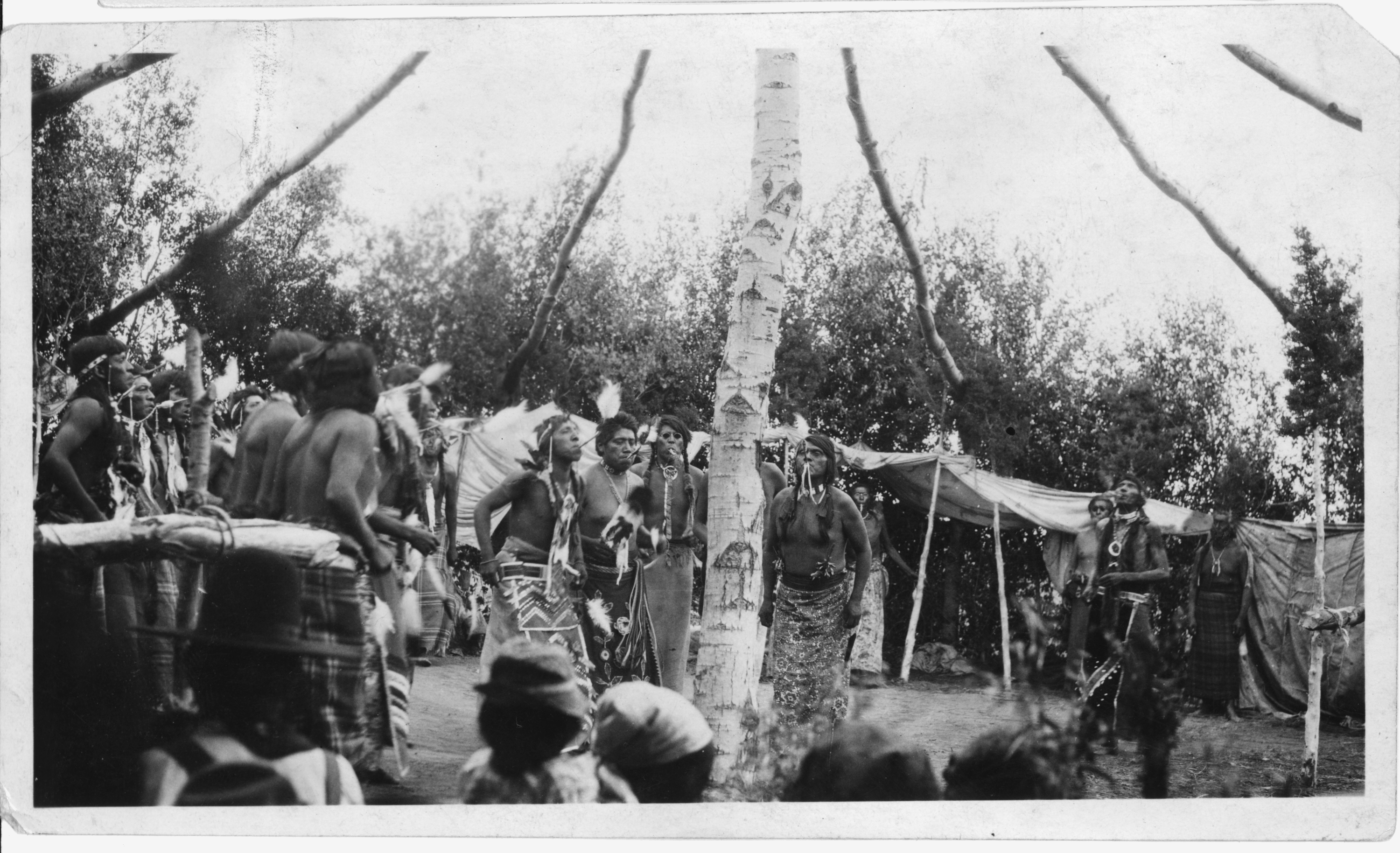
Sun Dance of the Shoshone Indians

Modern research has gathered considerable amounts of evidence that support the theory that pain is not only a physical phenomenon but rather a biopsychosocial phenomenon, encompassing culture, nociceptive stimuli, and the environment in the experience and perception of pain. For example, the Sun Dance is a ritual performed by traditional groups of Native Americans. In this ritual, cuts are made into the chest of a young man. Strips of leather are slipped through the cuts, and poles are tied to the leather. This ritual lasts for hours and undoubtedly generates large amounts of nociceptive signaling, however the pain may not be perceived as noxious or even perceived at all. The ritual is designed around overcoming and transcending the effects of pain, where pain is either welcomed or simply not perceived.

=== Visual input and pain perception ===
Additional research has shown that the experience of pain is shaped by a plethora of contextual factors, including vision. Researchers have found that when a subject views the area of their body that is being stimulated, the subject will report a lowered amount of perceived pain. For example, one research study used a heat stimulation on their subjects' hands. When the subject was directed to look at their hand when the painful heat stimulus was applied, the subject experienced an analgesic effect and reported a higher temperature pain threshold. Additionally, when the view of their hand was increased, the analgesic effect also increased and vice versa. This research demonstrated how the perception of pain relies on visual input.

The use of fMRI to study brain activity confirms the link between visual perception and pain perception. It has been found that the brain regions that convey the perception of pain are the same regions that encode the size of visual inputs. One specific area, the magnitude-related insula of the insular cortex, functions to perceive the size of a visual stimulation and integrate the concept of that size across various sensory systems, including the perception of pain. This area also overlaps with the nociceptive-specific insula, part of the insula that selectively processes nociception, leading to the conclusion that there is an interaction and interface between the two areas. This interaction tells the individual how much relative pain they are experiencing, leading to the subjective perception of pain based on the current visual stimulus.

== See also ==
- Neuromatrix
