= Textbook of Pain =

Medical textbook

- Publisher: Elsevier
- Publication date: 1984
- ISBN: 978-0702040597

Wall & Melzack's Textbook of Pain is a medical textbook published by Elsevier. It is named after Patrick David Wall and Ronald Melzack, who introduced the gate control theory into pain research in the 1960s. First released in 1984, the book has been described as "the most comprehensive scientific reference text in the field of pain medicine".

In 1999, the book went into its fourth edition, shortly before the death of its founding editor, Patrick David Wall, in 2001. It is currently in its 6th edition.

== See also ==
- Practical Management of Pain
