= McGill Pain Questionnaire =

- Synonyms: McGill Pain Index
- Purpose: scale to rate pain

The McGill Pain Questionnaire, also known as McGill Pain Index, is a scale of rating pain developed at McGill University by Melzack and Torgerson in 1971. It is a self-report questionnaire that allows individuals to give their doctor a good description of the quality and intensity of pain that they are experiencing. The users are presented with a list of 78 words in 20 sections that are related to pain. The users mark the words that best describe their pain (multiple markings are allowed). Among the words, sections of these words signify different components of pain, namely, Sensory (sections 1-10), Affective (sections 11-15), Evaluative (section 16), and Miscellaneous (sections 17-20).

According to the European Medicines Agency it is the most frequently used measurement tool for multidimensional pain assessment in chronic pain.

== Sample questionnaire ==
Group	Words
1	Flickering, Pulsing, Quivering, Throbbing, Beating, Pounding
2	Jumping, Flashing, Shooting
3	Pricking, Boring, Drilling, Stabbing
4	Sharp, Cutting, Lacerating
5	Pinching, Pressing, Gnawing, Cramping, Crushing
6	Tugging, Pulling, Wrenching
7	Hot, Burning, Scalding, Searing
8	Tingling, Itchy, Smarting, Stinging
9	Dull, Sore, Hurting, Aching, Heavy
10	Tender, Taut (tight), Rasping, Splitting
11	Tiring, Exhausting
12	Sickening, Suffocating
13	Fearful, Frightful, Terrifying
14	Punishing, Grueling, Cruel, Vicious, Killing
15	Wretched, Blinding
16	Annoying, Troublesome, Miserable, Intense, Unbearable
17	Spreading, Radiating, Penetrating, Piercing
18	Tight, Numb, Squeezing, Drawing, Tearing
19	Cool, Cold, Freezing
20	Nagging, Nauseating, Agonizing, Dreadful, Torturing
