= Specie (disambiguation) =

Specie is synonymous with bullion coin, namely coins made of precious metals above a certain minimum bar of refinement quality.

Specie may also refer to:

- Specie Circular, 1836 executive order by US President Andrew Jackson regarding hard money
- Specie Payment Resumption Act

== See also ==
- Hard money (policy)
- Commodity money
- Species (disambiguation)
