= Neuromatrix =

Theorized neuron network in pain perception

The neuromatrix theory of pain states that the perception of painful stimuli does not result from the brain's passive registration of tissue trauma, but from its active generation of subjective experiences through a network of neurons known as the neuromatrix. The theory was proposed by Ronald Melzack in 1990.

Recent research has identified the anterior cingulate cortex as a critical part of the neuromatrix.

== Criticism ==
Criticism of this concept stem from its lack of conceptual originality. For example:

Historically and philosophically, the basic premises of this theory are not new, not does it differ remarkably in fundamental principles from other contemporary theories of brain function and consciousness

— Chapman, C.R.

== See also ==
- Gate control theory
