= Stockholm, Royal Library, manuscript X. 90 =

Early fifteenth-century manuscript

Stockholm, Royal Library, manuscript X. 90 (also known as Kungliga Bibliotek, handskrift X. 90 or 10. 90) is an early fifteenth-century manuscript noted for the Middle English medical texts that it contains.

== Origins and provenance ==
The quarto manuscript is made almost entirely of 'greyish and thick' paper, but pages 7–10 are made of two folios of vellum, while pages 94–104 are dyed red. The codex seems to have been composed in the first quarter of the fifteenth century, and exhibits four hands (of which the first and fourth contributed most of the material). Mention of Frawsham Halle on p. 49 associates the production of the manuscript with Fransham in Norfolk. Dialectal analysis using the Linguistic Atlas of Late Mediaeval English supports the idea that the manuscript was a Norfolk production, though the texts it contains at least sometimes originated elsewhere. The final leaves of the manuscript have been lost.

The manuscript is thought to have been donated to Stockholm's royal library by Christianus Ravius, who spent time in Oxford, and served as Sweden's Royal Librarian 1655–59; the volume was accessioned in 1706.

== Contents and editions ==
Irma Taavitsainen summarised the English contents of the manuscript in the Index of Middle English Prose as follows(with additional information added from other sources):

Item no	Contents	MS pages	Main editions	Notes
1	Medical recipes	1–18		70 recipes in English followed by four in Latin
2	Medicinal plants and their virtues	18–32	(excerpt)	
3	Medical recipes	32–35		23 medical recipes in English ending with a Latin note
none	Poem on health	35–47		a 460-line poem of medical advice
4	Medical recipes and charms	47–48		8 texts
none	Poem on plants	49–78		A 1025-line poem on plants and their properties
5	Henry Daniel's translation of the treatise on rosemary	80–86		
6	Medical recipes	86–91		14 medical recipes
7	Medical recipes	91–93		7 medical recipes
8	Medical recipes	93		A recipe 'for the mygrym'
9	Medical recipes and charms	95–104		60 medical recipes and charms
10	Medical recipes and charms	105–23		115 medical recipes and charms
11	Urinology	123–26		
12	Medical rules	126–27		Four rules for interpreting pregnancy
13	Medical recipes and charms	127–50		73 medical recipes and charms in English, with some in Latin in the middle
14	Phlebotomy	150–52		The treatise lists the veins and gives guidance on bloodletting
15	Medical recipes	152–55		
16	Agnus Castus	156–216		

The distribution of scribal activity in the manuscript is as follows:

pages	hand
1–91	1
91–93	2
93	3
95–104	4
104–216	1

A selection of the prose texts from the manuscript was published by Ferdinand Holthausen in 1897. Though superseded by other editions, Holthausen's selection remains in use as a convenient sample of Middle English medical recipes; he printed samples from pages 14, 26, 31, 33, 34, 35, 47, 85, 103, 104, 110, 117, 120, 121, 129, 136–37, 145, and 155.
