= The Modern Home Physician =

- Author: Victor Robinson (editor)
- Language: English
- Subject: Medicine
- Publisher: Wm. H. Wise & Company
- Publication date: 1934
- Publication place: United States
- Media type: Print (Hardcover)
- Pages: 728 (first edition)

The Modern Home Physician, A New Encyclopedia of Medical Knowledge is a medical encyclopedia first published in 1934 by the Wm. H. Wise & Company in New York City. It was edited by Victor Robinson, Ph. C., M.D., who was a physician and professor of the History of Medicine at Temple University's School of Medicine in Philadelphia, Pennsylvania and also the editor-in-chief of the reading materials Historia Medicinae, Medical Life, and Medical Review of Reviews. It is a rare medical reference and collector's edition with entries that are in encyclopedic format, alphabetically arranged, and designed for use in the home. It has 728 pages that also contain, apart from the text, 232 photographs and almost 700 drawings.
