= Miller-Keane Encyclopedia & Dictionary of Medicine, Nursing, and Allied Health =

- 1997 edition
- Author: O'Toole, Marie (editor)
- Language: English
- Genre: Medical, Dictionaries & Terminology
- Publisher: W. B. Saunders
- Publication place: United States of America
- Media type: Print (hardcover)

The Miller-Keane Encyclopedia & Dictionary of Medicine, Nursing, and Allied Health is written for use by students and health care providers including medics, nurses, and paramedics. The entries are alphabetical and compiled with multidisciplinary collaboration. Illustrations and tables were included from the sixth edition. The latest edition is the seventh, which lists over 40,000 terms and was published in 2005.

The book has been reviewed by publications including the American Journal of Occupational Therapy, Gastroenterology Nursing, Annals of the Rheumatic Diseases, Hospitals & Health Networks, and Hospital Topics.
