= Liu Juanzi Guiyi Fang =

Fifth-century Chinese medical text

Liu Juanzi Guiyi Fang (traditional Chinese: 劉涓子鬼遺方; simplified Chinese: 刘涓子鬼遗方; pinyin: Liú Juānzi Guǐyí Fāng), (Note: Translated into English as Liu Juan-zi's Ghost-Bequeathed Formulae, Master Liu Juan's Ghost-Left Formulas, or Recipes of Liu Juanzi, Handed Down by Ghosts.) also known as Shenxian Yi Lun (Chinese: 神仙遺論; pinyin: Shénxiān yí lùn), is a Chinese medical text allegedly written by the titular Liu Juanzi and published during the Northern and Southern dynasties in 499. The original text comprised ten volumes and is no longer extant; an abridged version by Gong Qingxuan was published sometime in the Song dynasty.

== Publication history ==
According to tradition, Liu Juanzi Guiyi Fang was written in the early 5th century by military physician Liu Juanzi (劉涓子), who had received a yong ju fang (癰疽方; "Recipes for [the Treatment of] Obstruction- and Impediment-Illnesses") from a ghost named Huangfu (黄父). First published during the Northern and Southern Dynasties in 499, it is the earliest known Chinese medical text about surgery. The original text comprised ten juan or volumes but is no longer extant, although fragments were unearthed in Xinjiang in 1902.

Much of the original text was reproduced in later publications such as the Wai tai mi yao fang (外臺秘要方) and the Zheng lei ben cao (證類本草). Moreover, a surviving abridged version containing five of the original ten volumes was compiled by Gong Qingxuan (龔慶宣; fl. 550–577) and published sometime in the Song dynasty (960–1279). Almost all of the formulae in the five-volume edition were copied into Sun Simiao's Qianjin yifang (千金翼方).

== Contents ==
The five volumes collected in Gong Qingxuan's revision pertain to the causes and treatment of ulcers and carbuncles as well as the treatment of other maladies such as blood stasis, burns, insomnia, mastitis, rectal prolapse, and scabies.
