= Cheek reconstruction =

- Specialty: Plastic surgery

The cheek constitutes the facial periphery and plays a key role in the maintenance of oral competence and mastication. It is also involved in the facial manifestation of human emotion and supports neighboring primary structures.

The most common causes of acquired cheek defects are tumors, burns, and trauma. Congenital abnormalities in cheek contour may be due to facial clefts, vascular anomalies, or facial wasting syndromes. The repair of these defects seeks to achieve aesthetic and functional ends that must be carefully considered by the reconstructive surgeon.

== Aesthetic unit principles ==
The face can be divided into six facial aesthetic units, with unique anatomic and aesthetic features. There are three central and three peripheral aesthetic units: eyelids, nose and lips; and forehead, cheek and chin, respectively. The aesthetic surface anatomy characteristics of the cheek have been described by Menick:

"The face can be divided into adjacent topographic areas of characteristic skin quality (color, texture, hair bearing), outline, and contour that define its regional units. The skin quality of the cheek matches the face in color and texture. The peripheral outline of the cheek unit is formed by the contours of the bordering units (forehead, eyelids, nose, lips, neck, and ear). Its outline follows the pre-auricular contours of the tragus and helix; goes around the sideburn, across the zygomatic arch, and into the lower eyelid-cheek junction; and then passes inferiorly along the nasal sidewall into the nasolabial fold and marionette line, around the chin and toward the submental crease. It then extends laterally along the jawline, passing superiorly up the angle of the jaw and back to the ear. In contour, the cheek is a relatively flat, expensive surface, except for the soft roundness of the nasolabial folds and cheek prominences."

== Surgical anatomy ==
=== Vascular supply ===
The external carotid artery (ECA), with contributions from the internal carotid artery (ICA) system, is the predominant arterial blood supply to the skin and muscles of the cheek. The greatest contribution is from the facial artery which traverses the face obliquely and terminates in the angular artery. The dorsal nasal artery runs along the nose and is the terminal branch of the ophthalmic artery, which is a terminal branch of the ICA. Many smaller branches and communications also exist.

The venous drainage system of the cheek is predominantly formed by the anterior facial vein, which subsequently communicates with the internal jugular vein. However, substantial drainage via the ophthalmic, infraorbital, and deep facial veins communicates with the cavernous sinus

=== Lymphatic system ===
The most important lymph nodes in the area are the intraparotid, submandibular and the submental lymph nodes. The inferior and medial parts usually drain to the submandibular nodes while the lateral and upper parts to the parotid nodes. Other lymphatic nodes include buccal nodes and submental nodes.

=== Innervation ===
The nerve supply of the cheek can be divided into sensory and motor systems. Sensation to the cheek is carried primarily by the second (maxillary) and third (mandibular) divisions of the trigeminal nerve (cranial nerve V). The facial nerve (cranial nerve VII) provides motor innervation to the muscles of facial expression.

== Reconstructive options ==
The primary goals of cheek reconstruction include the restoration of native function, maximization of aesthetic outcome, and limitation of repair related morbidity. Implicit in this statement is the intent to re-established both internal and external coverage, expressivity, masticatory function and aesthetic contour and quality.

=== Local flaps ===
==== Anterior-based cervicofacial flap ====
The advantages of this flap is that there is no need to skin graft the donor site and scars are placed at the natural skin folds. This flap is used for posterior and moderate-sized anterior cheek defects. Lower eyelid ectropion should be prevented, by minimizing tension and by overcorrection and suspension of the cheek flap to the lateral orbital rim. This anterior-based flap is supplied by the facial and submental arteries and advances upward from the cervical area and rotates forward.

==== Posterior-based cervicofacial flap ====
A posterior-based cervicofacial cheek flap is used for small and moderate-sized anterior cheek defects. This flap is used for reconstruction of small medial cheek defects next to the nose or lips. The flap is supplied by the superficial temporal artery and vessels in the pre-auriculair region.

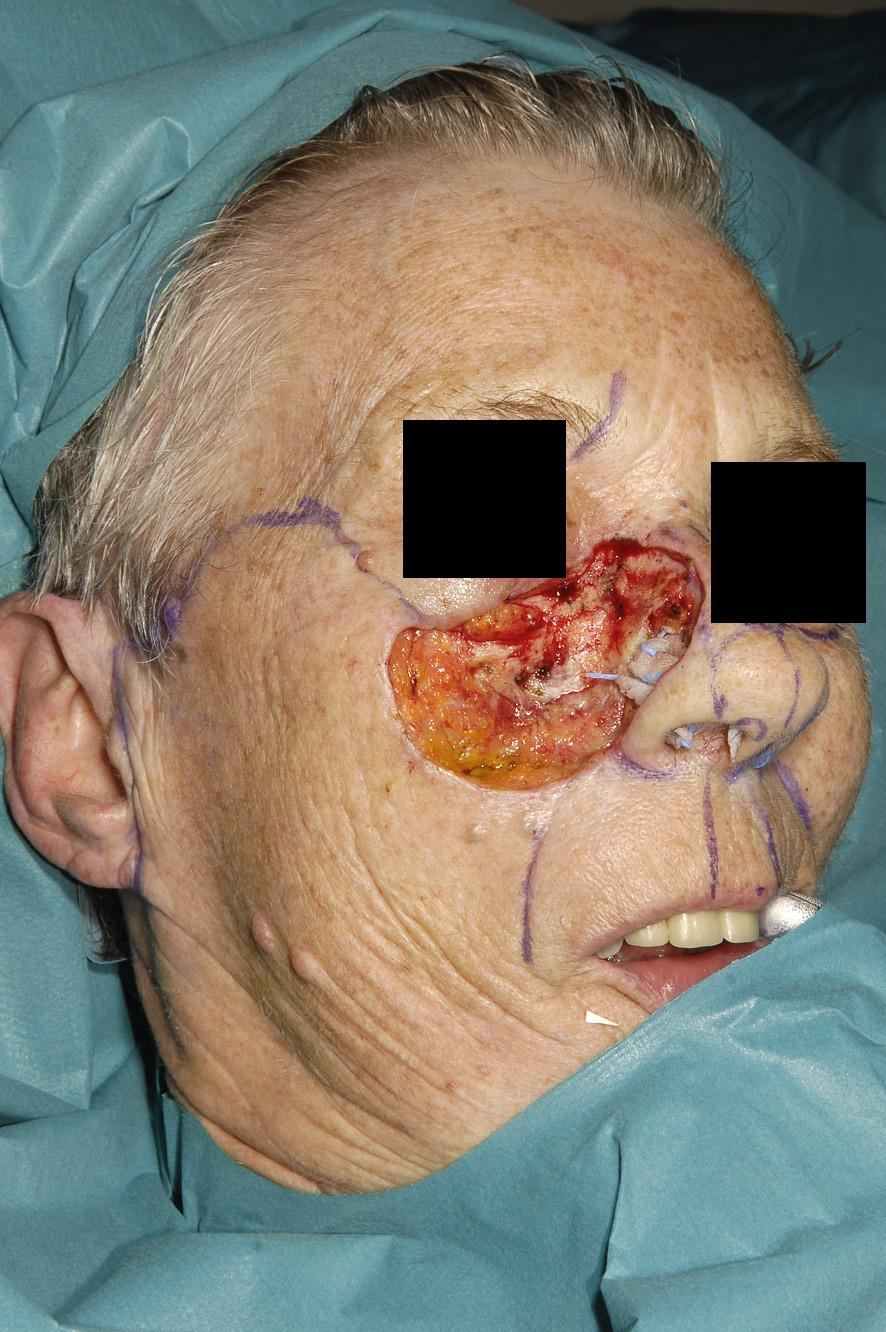
Moderate-sized anterior cheek defect

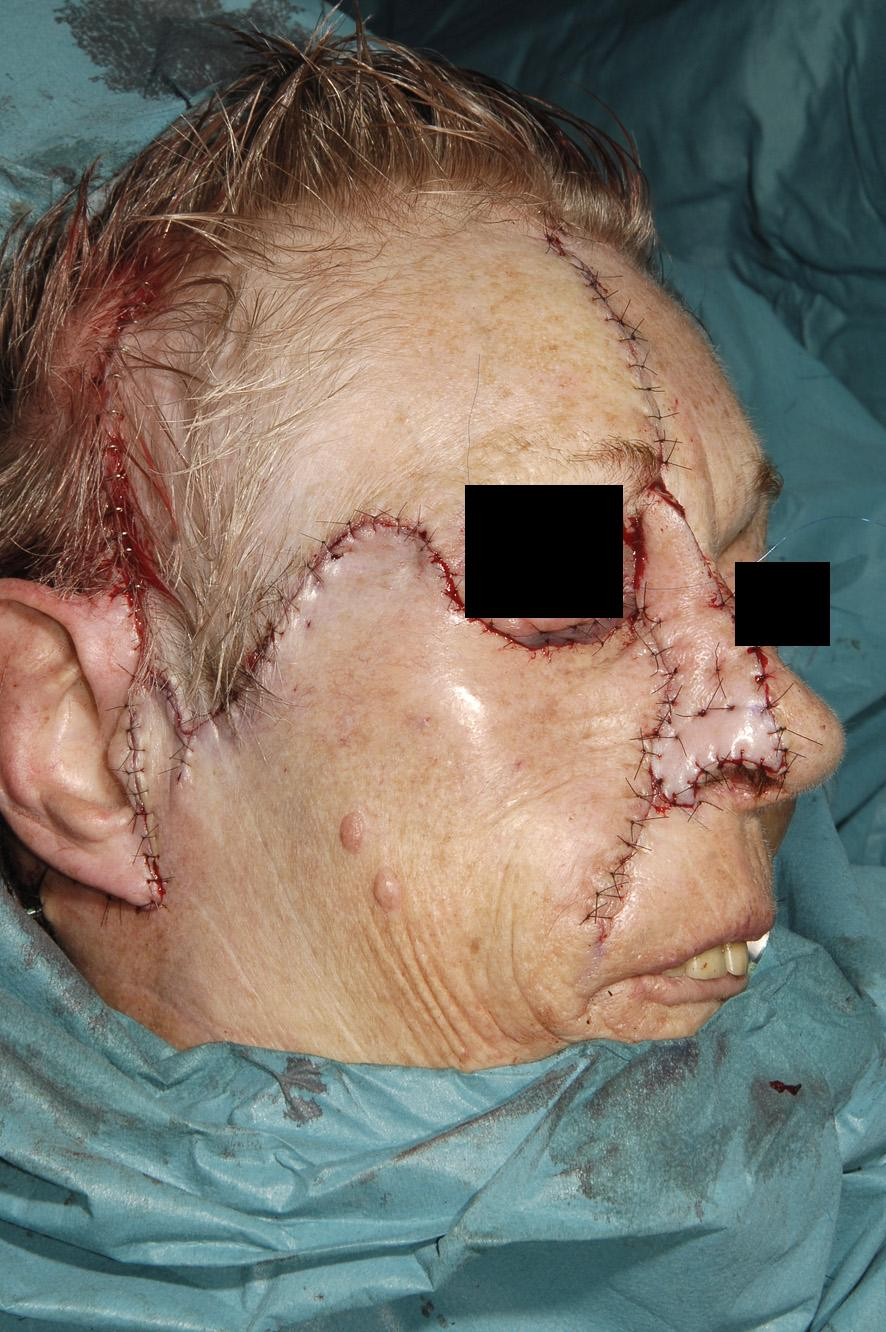
Moderate-sized anterior cheek defect after reconstruction

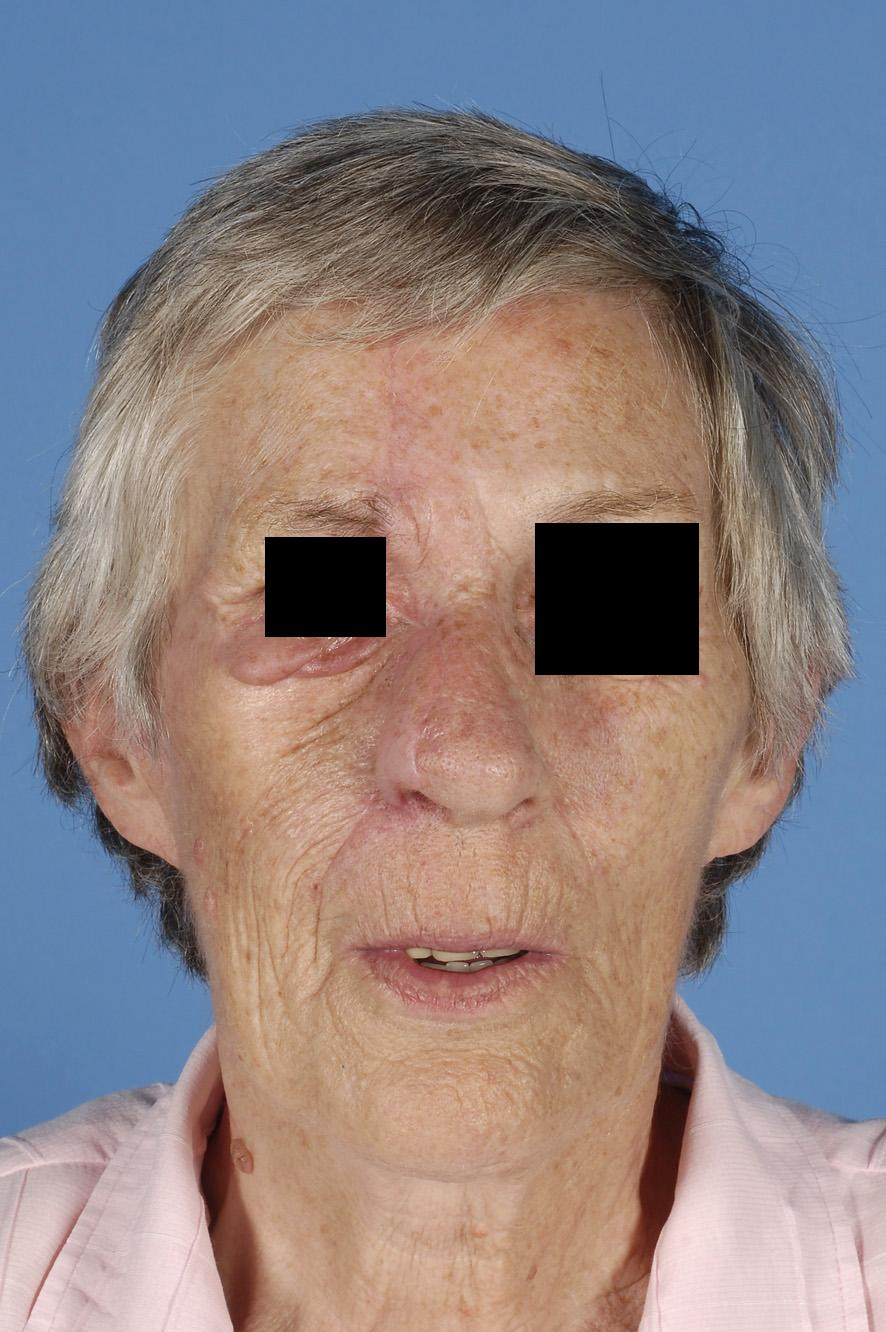
Moderate-sized anterior cheek defect final result.jpg

Moderate-sized defect

=== Locoregional flaps ===
==== Anterior-based cervicopectoral flap ====
Larger posterior or lower cheek defects up to 10 cm can be closed if the incision of an anterior-based cervicofacial flap is extended, converting it into a cervicopectoral flap, which moves neck and chest skin to the face. This flap is vascularized by the internal mammary perforators. Advantages of this flap are its good skin color, texture, hair-bearing match and the location of the scars at natural folds.

==== Posterior-based cervicopectoral flap ====
For larger anterior cheek defects, the posterior-based cervicofacial flap is continued inferiorly along the sternum, then laterally down across the chest, above the nipple and toward the axilla. This flap is supplied by the superficial temporal artery and vessels, the vertebral and occipital arteries and the perforators of the trapezius muscle.

=== Regional flap ===
==== Platysma Musculocutaneous flap ====
This flap can be used for various defects in the head and neck area. Based on the dominant blood supply there are three different variations of the PMF: superior, posterior or inferior based. Only the superior and posterior based PMF is suitable for oral and facial reconstruction. The thin, quadrangular shaped, and paired platysma muscles lie in the superficial fascia of the neck.

===== Superior platysma musculocutaneos flap =====
The dominant blood supply is from the submental branch of the facial artery and the venous drainage of the v. submentalis. The arc of rotation is suitable for reconstruction of the anterior and lateral floor of mouth, buccal mucosa, retromolar trigone, and skin of the lower cheek and parotid region.

===== Posterior platysma musculocutaneos flap =====
This flap receives its blood supply primarily from branches of the a. occipitalis. Venous drainage is the v. jugularis interna.

The arc of rotation is suitable for reconstruction of the lower lip, floor of mouth, ventral tongue, and lower one third of the face. For the proper arc of rotation an adequate exposure of the muscle is necessary.

Advantages of the PMF is that the platysma flap has an appropriate thickness, minimal donor- site morbidity, acceptable scar and colour match and it is easy and faster to harvest. During the procedure the neck is in a hyperextended position.

=== Tissue expanders ===
An adjunct to the utilization of local and locoregional flaps is the option of tissue expanders. They effectively increase the net skin surface area and provide skin that has the same texture, colour, and hair bearing qualities as the recipient site.

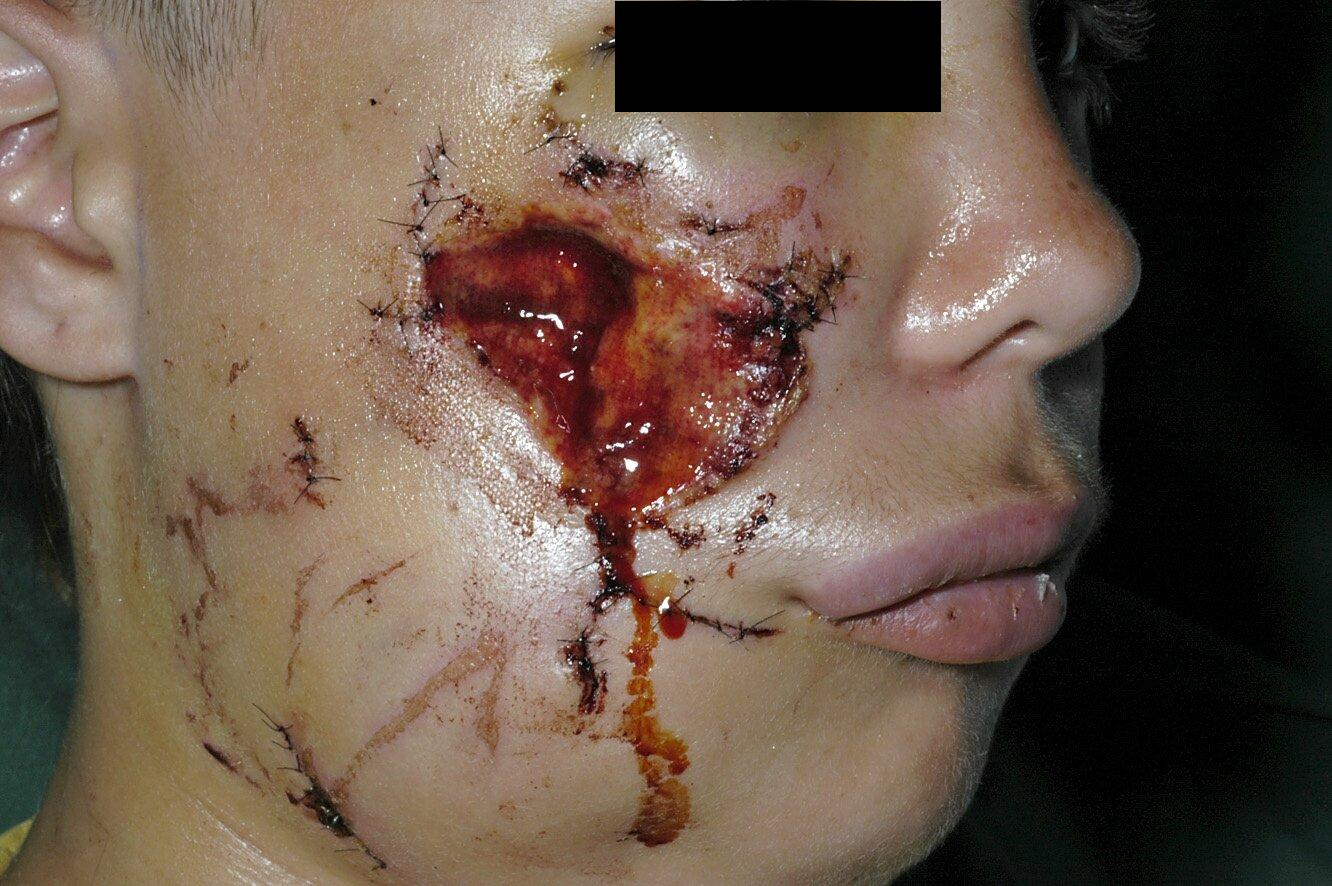
Cheek defect

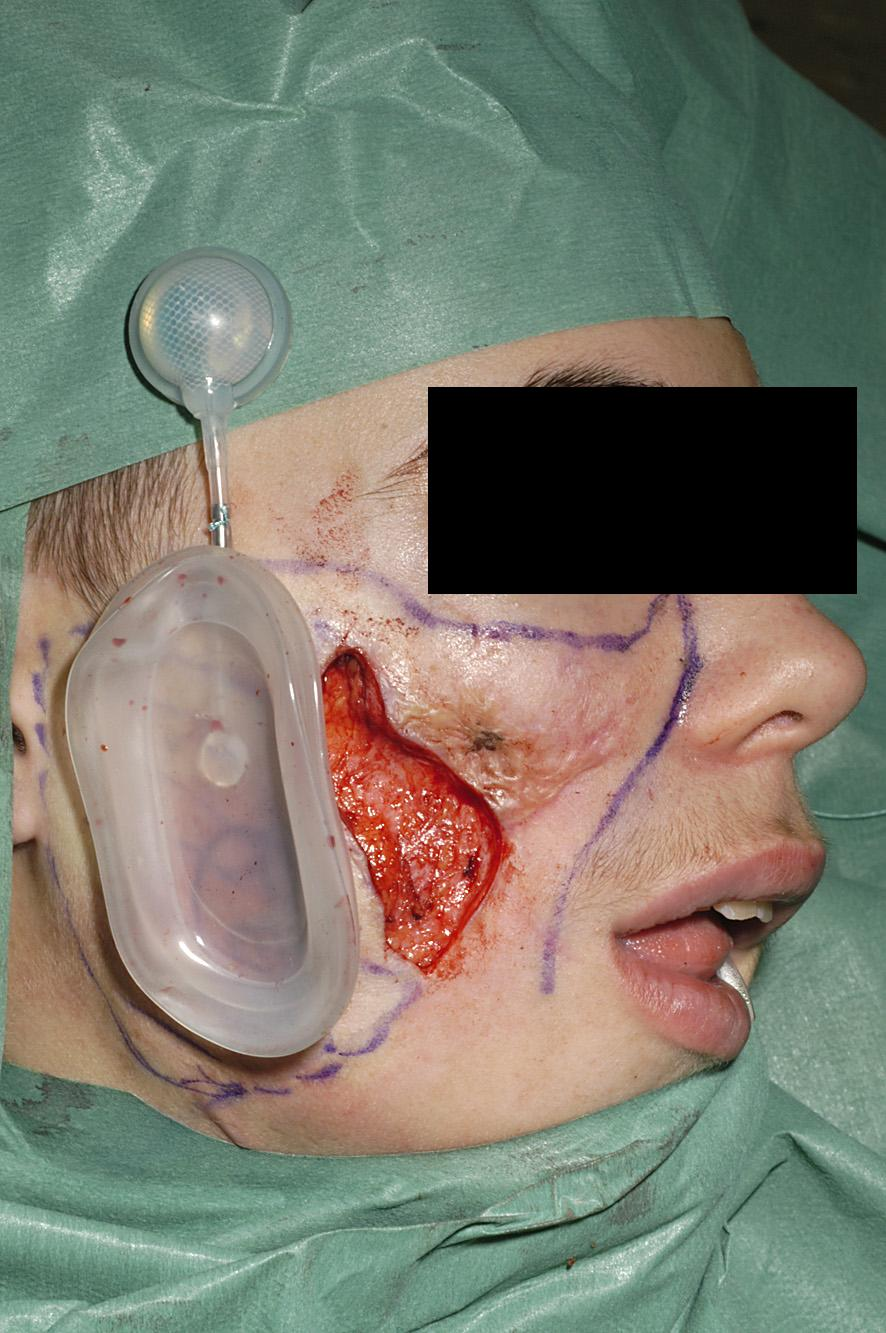
Tissue expander

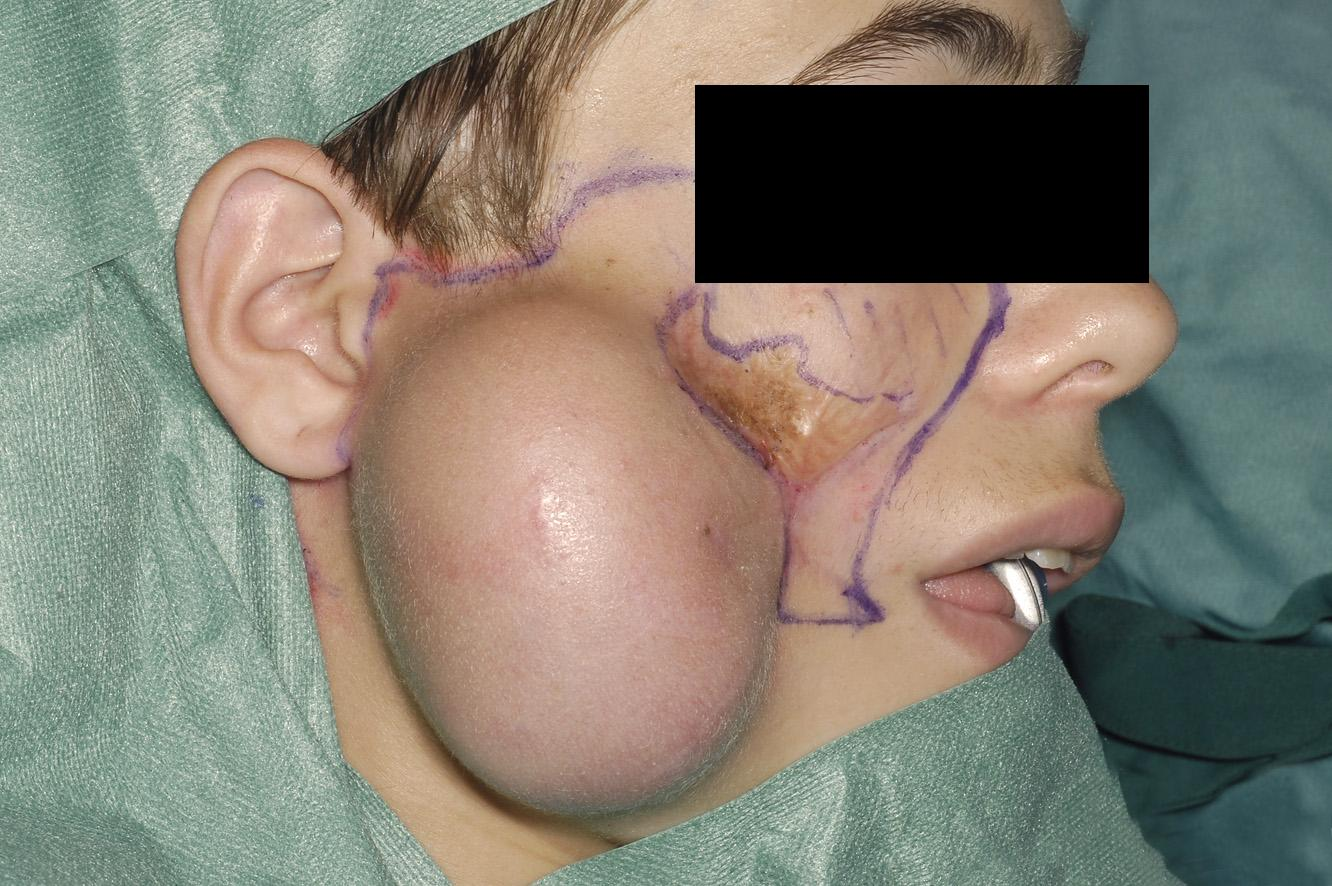
Using tissue expander to provide more skin

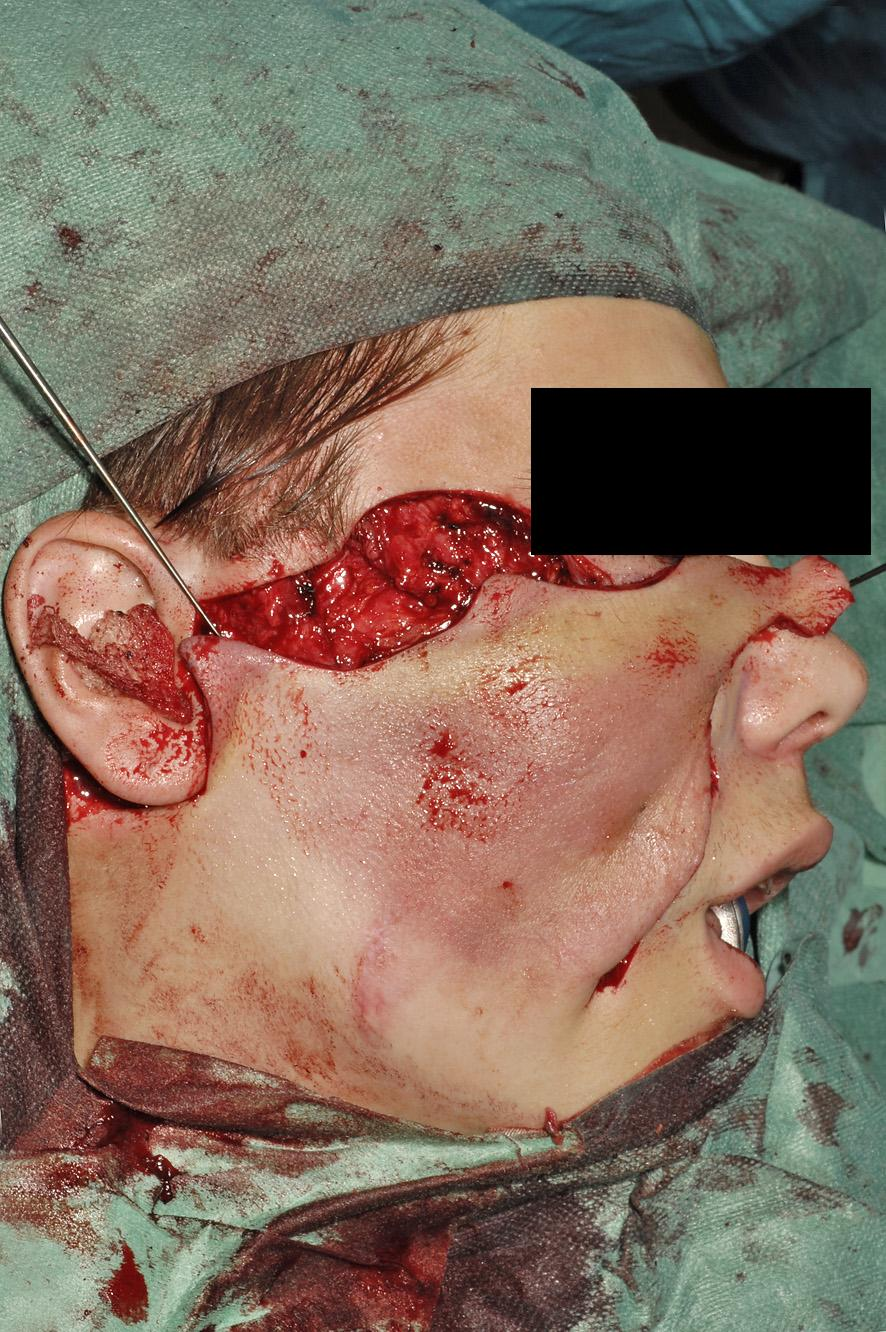
Transposition of flap after removal of tissue expander

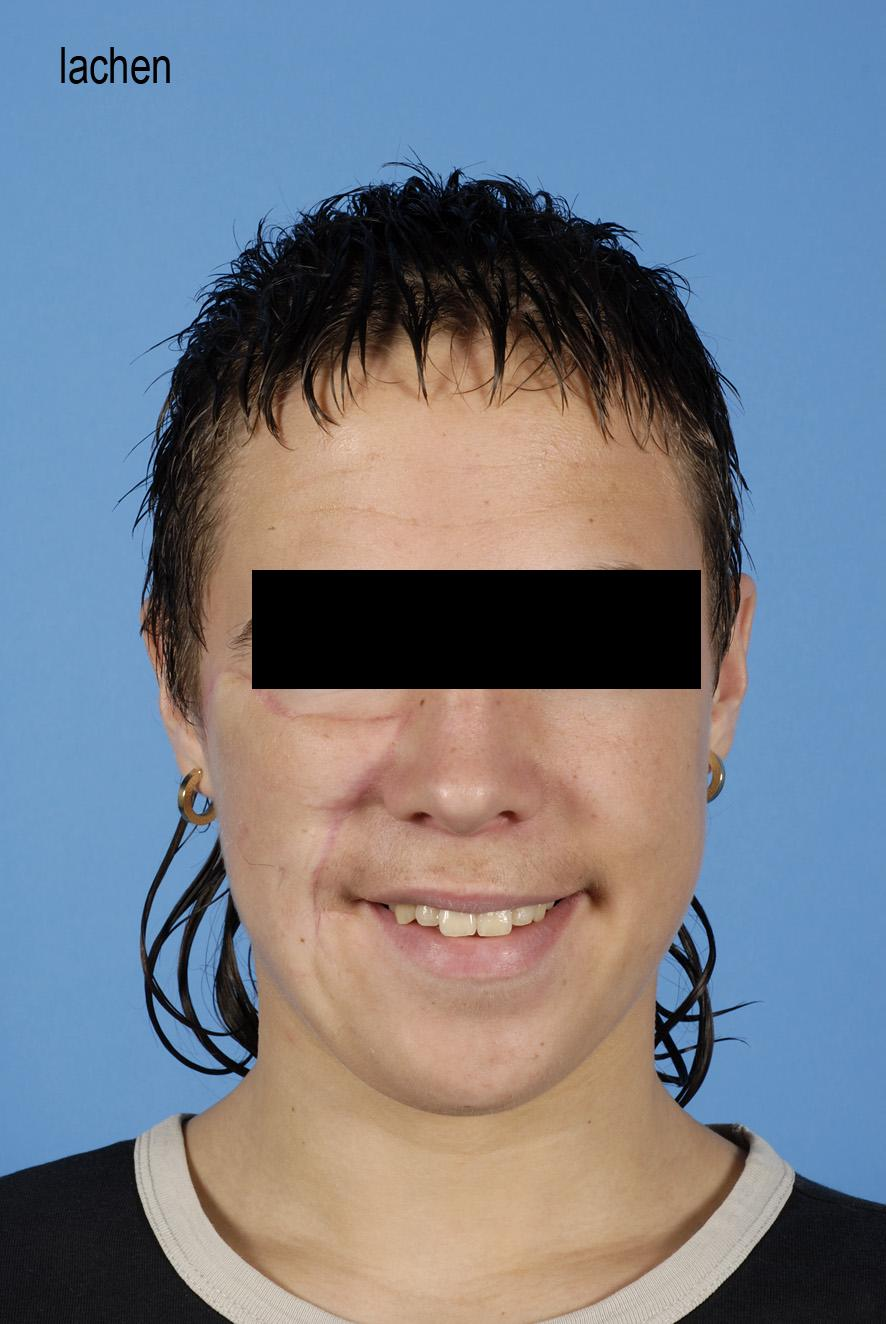
Final result

Tissue expander

=== Pedicled flaps ===
Pedicled flaps are used when regional tissue is not available, for example because of burns or radiation. There are two pedicled flaps that are sometimes used for reconstruction of cheek defects with or without pre-expansion:

==== Supraclavicular flap ====
The supraclavicular flap, also known as the "epaulette" flap, is vascularized by the supraclavicular artery, which branches off the transverse cervical artery. The vessels can be found using a hand held doppler in the triangle between the dorsal edge of the sternocleidomastoid muscle, the external jugular vein, and the medial part of the clavicle. The flap can be raised as an island flap as well as a pedicled flap.

==== Deltopectoral flap ====
The deltopectoral flap is beneficial for reconstruction of significant cheek defects, offering up to 250 cm2 of transferable cutaneous tissue to allow reconstruction of the entire cheek. The deltopectoral flap tolerates folding very well and allows movement in wide directions.

=== Free flaps ===
Thanks to further refinements of microvascular techniques in the past three decades, transfer of a free flap is now a routine procedure. Free flaps are the first choice in case of complex, composite, and through-through cheek defects with exposed bone, sinuses, orbit or dura. Advantages of free flaps are their reliable blood supply and freedom of planning. Potential disadvantages are the mismatch of colour, texture, facial shape and thickness.

Whereas a multitude of free flaps are available, the radial forearm, anterolateral thigh, scapular, and lateral arm flap are most useful in cheek reconstruction.

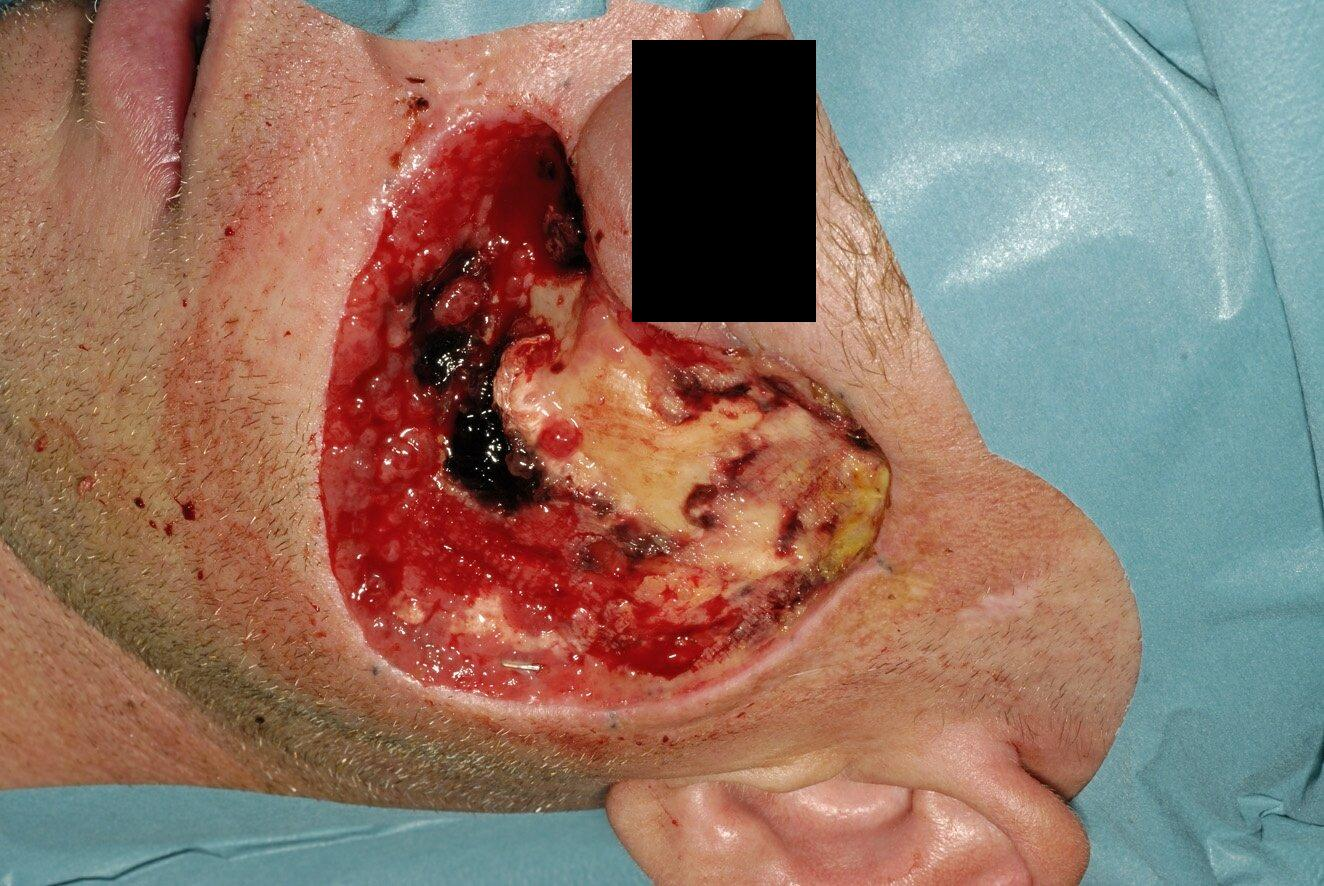
Cheek defect

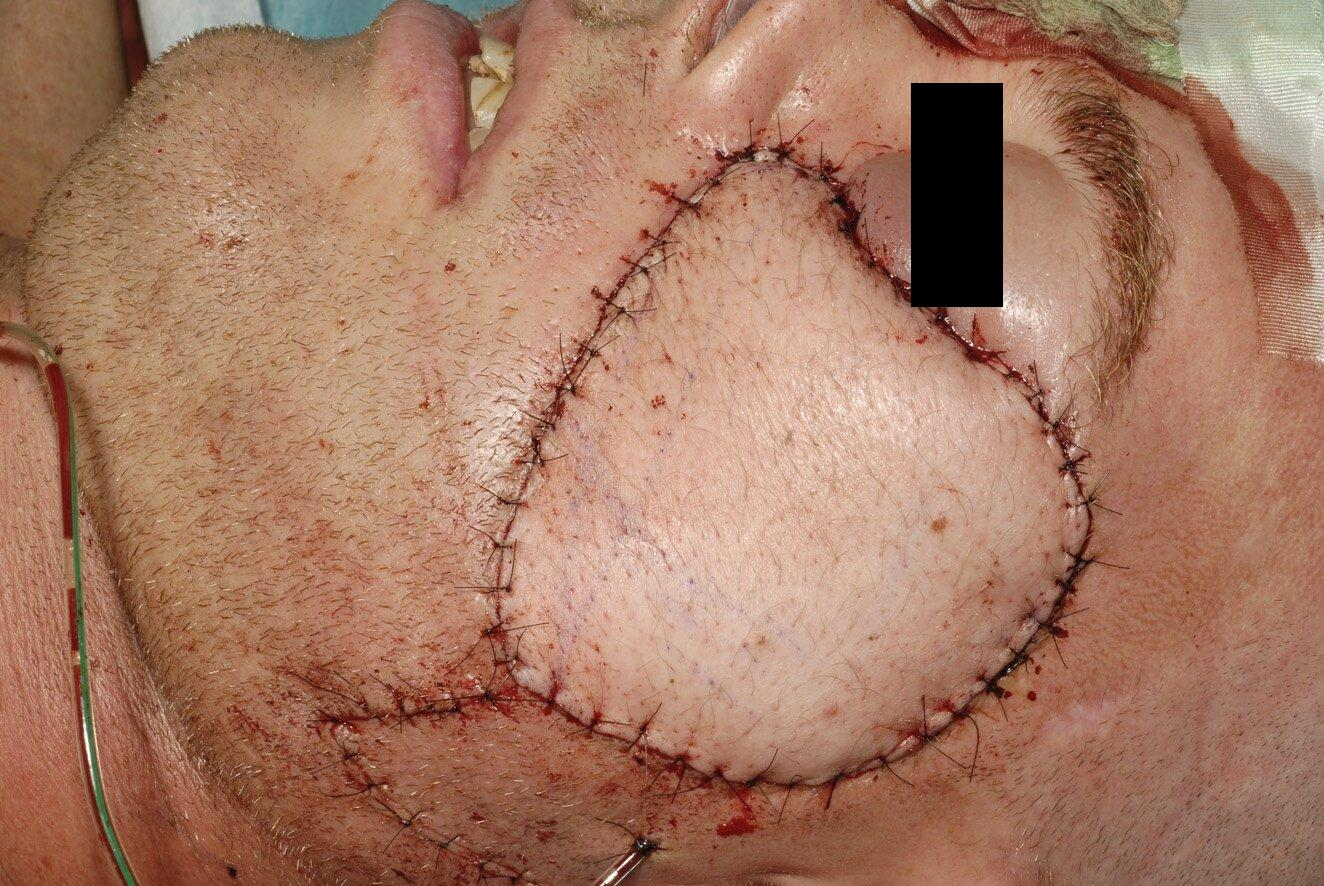
Reconstruction with a free ALT lap

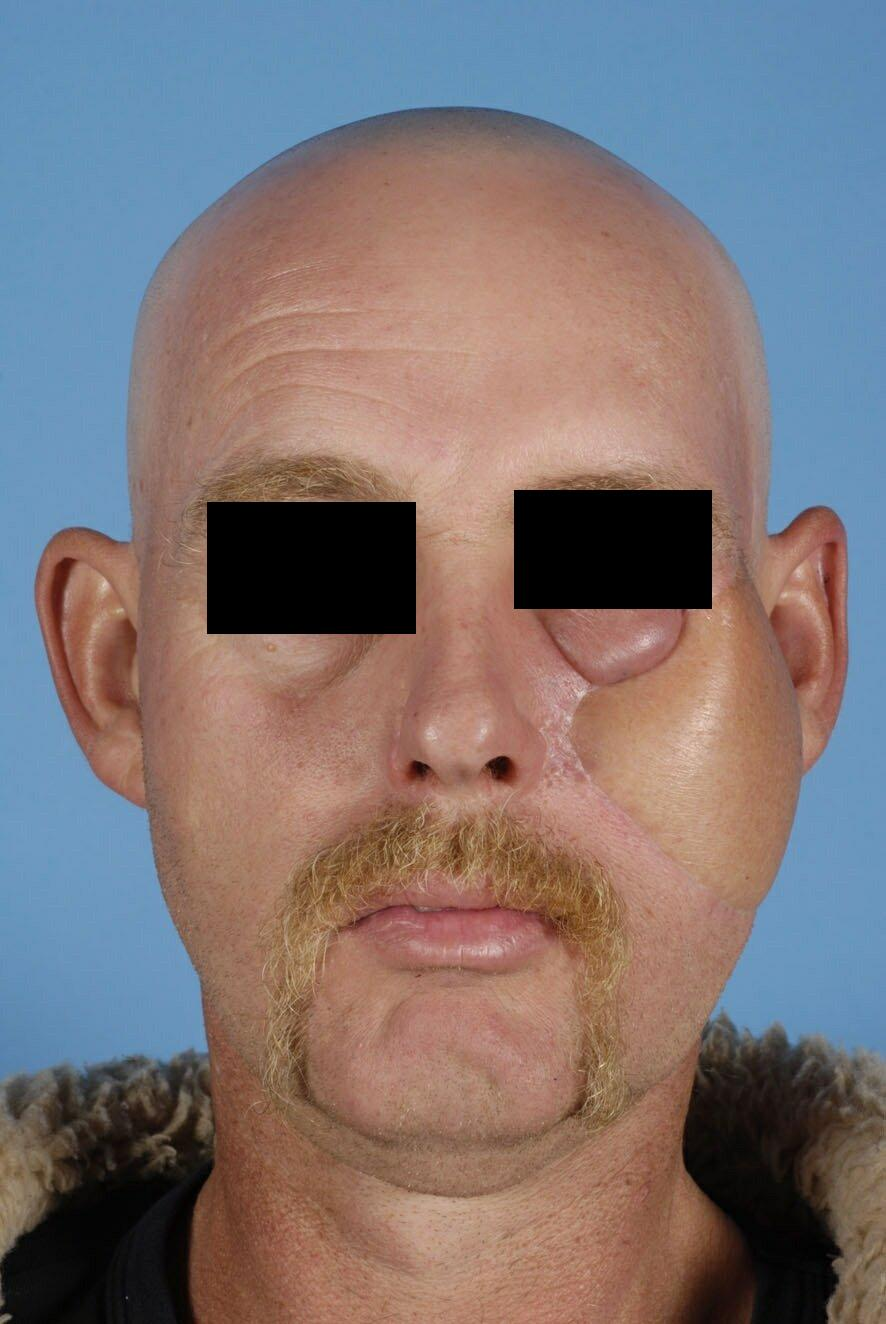
final result

Large cheek defect

=== Prefabricated flaps ===
Prefabrication of flaps opens interesting new possibilities. It is primarily used for reconstruction of complex defects where conventional techniques are not available (in burn patients where common donor sites may have been damaged or destroyed). Flap prefabrication starts with introduction of a vascular pedicle to a desired donor tissue that on its own does not possess an axial blood supply. After a period of neovascularization of at least 8 weeks, this donor tissue can then be transferred to the recipient defect based on the newly acquired axial vasculature. This process can be combined with the use of tissue expanders.

== Patient selection ==
Careful patient selection is essential for a successful outcome. Donor site morbidity, patient characteristics such as skin laxity, age, tobacco use and sun exposure, potential radiotherapy, planned lymph node dissection, the size of the defect, structural involvement (skin, muscle, nerves, bone), functional concerns like maintaining oral hygiene, swallowing, mouth opening, aesthetic concerns, experience of the surgeon are all factors that influence the kind of reconstructive technique that should be chosen.

== Complications ==
- Necrosis of the flap, because of insufficient blood supply. If the blood supply of the flap is lost the flap will die. Therefore, it is very important that the surgeon must maintain the integrity of the vessels at the base of the flap to improve the survival of the flap.
- Possible nerve damage during the reconstructive procedure
- Prolonged oedema of the delicate tissues of the lower eyelid,
- Abnormal hair distribution in the face. Even though soft tissue defects are managed by a secondary reconstructive surgery

== See also ==
- Scalp reconstruction
