= Washington Manual of Medical Therapeutics =

1942 medical textbook

- Authors: Wayland MacFarlane (1st edition); Siri Ancha, Christine Auberle, Cash Devin, Mohit Harsh (37th edition)
- Language: English
- Subject: Medicine
- Publisher: Lippincott Williams & Wilkins (37th edition)
- Publication date: 1942 (1st edition); 2022 (37th edition)
- ISBN: 978-1-97-519062-0

The Washington Manual of Medical Therapeutics (or the Washington Manual) is a medical textbook first published in 1942 by Wayland MacFarlane, a professor at the Washington University School of Medicine and chief of the internal medicine ward. Described as the "bible of the medical ward", the Washington Manual is now in its 37th edition and currently it is now the best-selling medical textbook in the world, with more than 200,000 copies worldwide. It has been translated into numerous languages including Spanish, Portuguese, Greek, Hungarian, Romanian, Turkish, Korean, Japanese and both simplified and classical Chinese. The book's current editors are Hilary E.L. Reno, Daniel H. Cooper, Andrew J. Krainik, and Sam J. Lubner.
