= Abeloff's Clinical Oncology =

- Fifth edition (2013)
- Language: English
- Subject: Oncology
- Genre: Reference
- Publisher: Churchill Livingstone; Elsevier
- Publication date: 1995 (1st edition); 2000 (2nd edition); 2004 (3rd edition); 2008 (4th edition); 2013 (5th edition); 2019 (6th edition)
- Pages: 2,072 (6th edition)
- ISBN: 9780323476744

Abeloff's Clinical Oncology is a medical reference work covering the field of oncology. First released in 1995 by Churchill Livingstone, it is currently published by Elsevier.

== History ==
The first edition, titled Clinical Oncology, was published by Churchill Livingstone in 1995. In 2000, a second edition was released with an extra chapter on cancer prevention and screening. A third edition was released four years later with more updates over the previous edition.

Its founding editor, Martin Abeloff, died in 2007. The book is currently in its sixth edition.

== Reception ==
Abeloff's Clinical Oncology has been described as a "recognized comprehensive oncology reference work", and one of the "most recognizable" oncology textbooks.
