= Gate control theory =

Theory about pain and the nervous system

The gate control theory of pain asserts that non-painful input closes the nerve "gates" to painful input, which prevents pain sensation from traveling to the central nervous system.

In the top panel, the nonnociceptive, large-diameter sensory fiber (orange) is more active than the nociceptive small-diameter fiber (blue), therefore the net input to the inhibitory interneuron (red) is net positive. The inhibitory interneuron provides presynaptic inhibition to both the nociceptive and nonnociceptive neurons, reducing the excitation of the transmission cells. In the bottom panel, an open "gate" (free-flowing information from afferents to the transmission cells) is pictured. This occurs when there is more activity in the nociceptive small-diameter fibers (blue) than the nonnociceptive large-diameter fibers (orange). In this situation, the inhibitory interneuron is silenced, which relieves inhibition of the transmission cells. This "open gate" allows for transmission cells to be excited, and thus pain to be sensed.

The gate control theory of pain describes how non-painful sensations can override and reduce painful sensations. A painful, nociceptive stimulus stimulates primary afferent fibers and travels to the brain via transmission cells. Increasing activity of the transmission cells results in increased perceived pain. Conversely, decreasing activity of transmission cells reduces perceived pain. In the gate control theory, a closed "gate" describes when input to transmission cells is blocked, therefore reducing the sensation of pain. An open “gate” describes when input to transmission cells is permitted, therefore allowing the sensation of pain.

First proposed in 1965 by Ronald Melzack and Patrick Wall, the theory offers a physiological explanation for the previously observed effect of psychology on pain perception. Combining early concepts derived from the specificity theory and the peripheral pattern theory, the gate control theory is considered to be one of the most influential theories of pain. This theory provided a neural basis which reconciled the specificity and pattern theories -- and ultimately revolutionized pain research.

Although there are some important observations that the gate control theory cannot explain adequately, this theory remains the theory of pain which most accurately accounts for the physical and psychological aspects of pain perception.

Willem Noordenbos (1910–1990), a Dutch researcher at the University of Amsterdam, proposed in 1959 a model which featured interaction between small (unmyelinated) and thick (myelinated) fibers. In this model, the fast (myelinated) fibers block the slow (unmyelinated) fibers: "fast blocks slow".

== Proposed mechanisms ==
When one experiences a negative sensation, such as pain from a bump or an itch from a bug bite, a common reaction is an attempt to eliminate the feeling by rubbing the painful bump or scratching the itchy bite. Gate control theory asserts that activation of nerves that do not transmit pain signals, called nonnociceptive fibers, can interfere with signals from pain fibers, thereby inhibiting pain. It is proposed that both small-diameter (pain-transmitting) and large-diameter (touch-, pressure-, and vibration- transmitting) afferent nerve fibers carry information from the site of the injury to two destinations in the dorsal horn: 1. Transmission Cells that carry the pain signal up to the brain, and 2. Inhibitory Interneurons that impede transmission cell activity. Activation of transmission cells occurs from both excitatory small-diameter and excitatory large-diameter fibers. However, activation of the inhibitory interneurons varies: large-diameter fibers excite the interneuron, which ultimately reduces transmission cell firing, whereas small-diameter fibers inhibit the inhibitory interneuron which lessens the inhibitory input to the transmission cell. Therefore, less pain is felt (via reduced transmission cell activity) when more activity in large-diameter fibers (touch-, pressure-, and vibration- transmitting) occurs relative to the activity in small-diameter (pain-transmitting) fibers.

The peripheral nervous system has centers at which pain stimuli can be regulated. Some areas in the dorsal horn of the spinal cord that are involved in receiving pain stimuli from Aδ and C fibers, called laminae, also receive input from Aβ fibers. The nonnociceptive fibers indirectly inhibit the effects of the pain fibers, 'closing a gate' to the transmission of their stimuli. In other parts of the laminae, pain fibers also inhibit the effects of nonnociceptive fibers, 'opening the gate'. This presynaptic inhibition of the dorsal nerve endings can occur through specific types of GABA_{A} receptors (not through the α1 GABA_{A} receptor and not through the activation of glycine receptors which are also absent from these types of terminals). Thus, certain GABA_{A} receptor subtypes but not glycine receptors can presynaptically regulate nociception and pain transmission.

An inhibitory connection may exist with Aβ and C fibers, which may form a synapse on the same projection neuron. The same neurons may also form synapses with an inhibitory interneuron that also synapses on the projection neuron, reducing the chance that the latter will fire and transmit pain stimuli to the brain (image on the right). The inhibitory interneuron fires spontaneously. The C fiber's synapse would inhibit the inhibitory interneuron, indirectly increasing the projection neuron's chance of firing. The Aβ fiber, on the other hand, forms an excitatory connection with the inhibitory interneuron, thus decreasing the projection neuron's chance of firing (like the C fiber, the Aβ fiber also has an excitatory connection on the projection neuron itself). Thus, depending on the relative rates of firing of C and Aβ fibers, the firing of the nonnociceptive fiber may inhibit the firing of the projection neuron and the transmission of pain stimuli.

== History and legacy ==
The firing of the projection neuron determines pain. The inhibitory interneuron decreases the chances that the projection neuron will fire. Firing of C fibers inhibits the inhibitory interneuron (indirectly), increasing the chances that the projection neuron will fire. Inhibition is represented in blue, and excitation in yellow. A lightning bolt signifies increased neuron activation, while a crossed-out bolt signifies weakened or reduced activation.

Firing of the Aβ fibers activates the inhibitory interneuron, reducing the chances that the projection neuron will fire, even in the presence of a firing nociceptive fiber.

Gate control theory asserts that activation of nerves which do not transmit pain signals, called nonnociceptive fibers, can interfere with signals from pain fibers, thereby inhibiting pain. Afferent pain-receptive nerves, those that bring signals to the brain, comprise at least two kinds of fibers - a fast, relatively thick, myelinated "Aδ" fiber that carries messages quickly with intense pain, and a small, unmyelinated, slow "C" fiber that carries the longer-term throbbing and chronic pain. Large-diameter Aβ fibers are nonnociceptive (do not transmit pain stimuli) and inhibit the effects of firing by Aδ and C fibers.

When it was first proposed in 1965, the theory was met with considerable skepticism. Despite having to undergo several modifications, its basic conception remains unchanged.

Ronald Melzack and Patrick Wall introduced their "gate control" theory of pain in the 1965 Science article "Pain Mechanisms: A New Theory". The authors proposed that both thin (pain) and large diameter (touch, pressure, vibration) nerve fibers carry information from the site of injury to two destinations in the spinal cord: transmission cells that carry the pain signal up to the brain, and inhibitory interneurons that impede transmission cell activity. Activity in both thin and large diameter fibers excites transmission cells. Thin fiber activity impedes the inhibitory cells (tending to allow the transmission cell to fire) and large diameter fiber activity excites the inhibitory cells (tending to inhibit transmission cell activity). So, the more large fiber (touch, pressure, vibration) activity relative to thin fiber activity at the inhibitory cell, the less pain is felt. The authors had drawn a neural "circuit diagram" to explain why we rub a smack. They pictured not only a signal traveling from the site of injury to the inhibitory and transmission cells and up the spinal cord to the brain, but also a signal traveling from the site of injury directly up the cord to the brain (bypassing the inhibitory and transmission cells) where, depending on the state of the brain, it may trigger a signal back down the spinal cord to modulate inhibitory cell activity (and so pain intensity). The theory offered a physiological explanation for the previously observed effect of psychology on pain perception.

In 1968, three years after the introduction of the gate control theory, Ronald Melzack concluded that pain is a multidimensional complex with numerous sensory, affective, cognitive, and evaluative components. Melzack's description has been adapted by the International Association for the Study of Pain in a contemporary definition of pain. Despite flaws in its presentation of neural architecture, the theory of gate control is currently the only theory that most accurately accounts for the physical and psychological aspects of pain.

The gate control theory attempted to end a century-old debate about whether pain is represented by specific neural elements (specificity theory) or by patterned activity (pattern theory) within a convergent somatosensory subsystem. Although it is now considered to be oversimplified with flaws in the presentation of neural architecture, the gate control theory spurred many studies in pain research and significantly advanced our understanding of pain.

== Therapeutic uses ==
The mechanism of gate control theory can be used therapeutically. Gate control theory thus explains how stimulus that activates only nonnociceptive nerves can inhibit pain. The pain seems to be lessened when the area is rubbed because activation of nonnociceptive fibers inhibits the firing of nociceptive ones in the laminae. In transcutaneous electrical nerve stimulation (TENS), nonnociceptive fibers are selectively stimulated with mild electrical currents through electrodes in order to produce this effect and thereby lessen pain.

One area of the brain involved in reduction of pain sensation is the periaqueductal gray matter that surrounds the third ventricle and the cerebral aqueduct of the ventricular system. Stimulation of this area produces analgesia (but not total numbing) by activating descending pathways that directly and indirectly inhibit nociceptors in the laminae of the spinal cord. Descending pathways also activate opioid receptor-containing parts of the spinal cord.

Afferent pathways interfere with each other constructively, so that the brain can control the degree of pain that is perceived, based on which pain stimuli are to be ignored to pursue potential gains. The brain determines which stimuli are profitable to ignore over time. Thus, the brain controls the perception of pain quite directly, and can be "trained" to turn off forms of pain that are not "useful". This understanding led Melzack to assert that pain is in the brain.

Gate control theory influenced the development of mindfulness-based pain management (MBPM).

== See also ==
- Tactile induced analgesia
- Neuromatrix
