= Netter's Essential Histology =

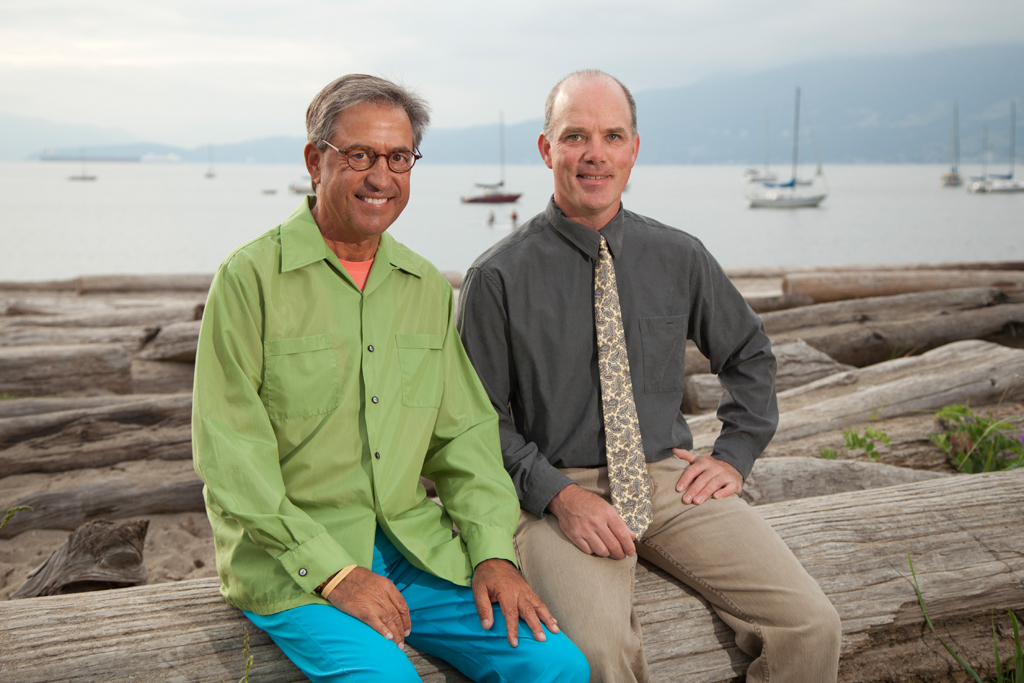
- Author: William K. Ovalle (left) and Patrick C. Nahirney (right)
- Illustrator: Frank H. Netter
- Language: English
- Subject: Human Histology
- Genre: Textbook/atlas
- Published: April 24, 2013 (2nd edition)
- Publisher: Elsevier/Saunders
- Publication place: United States
- Media type: Print (softcover), Online
- Pages: 517
- ISBN: 978-85-352-2803-8

Netter's Essential Histology is a textbook/atlas of human histology authored by William K. Ovalle and Patrick C. Nahirney. Drawings by medical illustrator, Frank H. Netter, with contributing artwork by James A. Perkins, Joe Chovan, John A. Craig, and Carlos A.G. Machado, are in the book. First published in English in 2008 by Elsevier/ Saunders, a 2nd edition was released in 2013. Subsequent editions in Portuguese, Korean, Greek, Turkish, and Italian have also been printed. The first Southeast Asia edition was released in English in 2015.

Directed to today’s problem-based, integrated curricula in medicine and dentistry, it is also intended for allied health care professionals, clinical residents, teachers, and researchers. A pictorial guide that highlights relevant microscopic and functional features of cells, tissues and organs of the body, the book has been recognized as "concisely written text with emphasis on concepts and not on details, supported by illustrations as well as light and electron micrographs".

Book contents can be accessed online; its resources include an image and virtual slide library with 20 high-resolution digitized light microscopic slides, 225 ‘zoomifiable’ electron micrographs, and short narrated video overviews of each of 20 chapters.

A separate, updated set of Netter’s Histology Flashcards (by the same authors) is in its 2nd edition. These more than 200 visual aids help in recognition and interpretation of microscopic sections at a glance, and also reinforce clinical relevance.

== Table of contents ==
=== Cell and Tissues ===
1. The Cell
2. Epithelium and Exocrine Glands
3. Connective Tissue
4. Muscle Tissue
5. Nervous Tissue
6. Cartilage and Bone
7. Blood and Bone Marrow

=== Systems ===
8. Cardiovascular System
9. Lymphoid System
10. Endocrine System
11. Integumentary System
12. Upper Digestive System
13. Lower Digestive System
14. Liver, Gallbladder, and Exocrine Pancreas
15. Respiratory System
16. Urinary System
17. Male Reproductive System
18. Female Reproductive System
19. Eye and Adnexa
20. Special Senses

== Reception ==
In 2008, the book won British Medical Association’s Best Illustrated Book Award. It has also been praised as "an excellent textbook with exquisite illustrations and micrographs that provide a broad coverage of histology with clinical correlations". "The book is successful in bridging the gap between gross anatomy and microscopic anatomy" (Published review by Dr.George Niiro: Doody Review: 5 stars)".
