= Current Medical Diagnosis and Treatment =

- Authors: Maxine Papadakis, Michael Rabow, Kenneth McQuaid (64th edition)
- Language: English
- Subject: Medicine
- Publisher: McGraw-Hill
- Publication date: 1961 (1st edition); 2025 (64th edition)
- Publication place: United States
- ISBN: 9781266266263

Current Medical Diagnosis and Treatment is a standard medical reference work published by McGraw-Hill. It is updated annually and the current 2022 version is its 61st edition. The editors of the 61st edition were Stephen McPhee, Maxine Papadakis, Michael Rabow and Kenneth McQuaid. It was originally published as a general work, but a number of specialist versions have since been released, such as pediatrics, cardiology, and surgery as part of the Lange "Current" series.
