= The Oxford Textbook of Medicine =

International textbook of medicine

- Author: John Firth, Christopher Conlon, and Timothy Cox
- Language: English
- Subject: Medicine
- Genre: Reference
- Published: 1983 (First Ed.); 2020 (Sixth Ed.); Oxford University Press
- Media type: Online & Hardbound

The Oxford Textbook of Medicine is an international textbook of medicine. First published in 1983, the sixth edition was released in 2020. It is primarily aimed at mature physicians looking for information outside their area of particular expertise, but widely used as a reference source by medical students and doctors in training, and by others seeking authoritative accounts of the science and clinical practice of medicine.

The Oxford Textbook of Medicine is available in print and online - where its contents are systematically updated.

== Description ==
The Oxford Textbook of Medicine covers the scientific aspects and clinical practice of internal medicine and its subspecialties. It offers practical guidance on clinical management and the prevention of disease.

Throughout the book, basic science and clinical practice are integrated, and the implications of research for medical practice are explained. Traditional specialty areas in clinical medicine are covered, and there are sections on the following; bioterrorism and forensic medicine; medical disorders in pregnancy; travel and expedition medicine; nutrition; the use of stem cells; regenerative medicine; and psychiatry and drug related problems in general medical practice.

The fifth edition of this book is different from previous editions, with each chapter including a chapter summary, and all illustrations and photographs now in full colour.

The 6th edition was published in March 2020.

== Online access ==
The sixth edition of the Oxford Textbook of Medicine is available online from Oxford University Press. The online edition contains the full-text, figures, and illustrations of the print version, as well as links to sources of related and further reading. All figures can be downloaded into PowerPoint.

The online edition of the Oxford Textbook of Medicine will be systematically updated twice a year.

Online access in low and middle income countries is supported by the Wellcome Trust and is made available through the World Health Organization-led HINARI Access to Research in Health programme.

== Editorial team ==
The Oxford Textbook of Medicine is edited by:

- David A. Warrell, Emeritus Professor of Tropical Medicine and Honorary Fellow of St Cross College, University of Oxford, UK
- Timothy M. Cox, Professor of Medicine, University of Cambridge; Honorary Consultant Physician, Addenbrooke's Hospital, Cambridge, UK
- John D. Firth, Consultant Physician and Nephrologist, Addenbrooke's Hospital, Cambridge, UK

In total, there are 750 contributors to the textbook.
