= Practical Management of Pain =

Medical textbook

- Editors: P. Prithvi Raj (first ed.)
- Language: English
- Subject: Pain management
- Genre: Reference
- Published: 1986 Year Book Medical (first ed); 2013–4 Elsevier (fifth ed.)
- ISBN: 9780815170136 (first ed.); 978-0323083409 (fifth ed.)
- OCLC: 324997960

Practical Management of Pain is a medical textbook on pain management. First published in 1986 by Year Book Medical Publishers which subsequently became part of Elsevier, the book's target audiences are medical residents, practicing anesthesiologists, and pain research fellows. Currently in its fifth edition, the book has been described by pain specialists as a "trusted reference source", and a "definitive text for the care of the pain patient".

== Overview ==
The current edition includes contributions from international authors, with new chapters covering ultrasound-guided techniques in regional anesthesiology and pain management procedures.

== Reception ==
The second edition of Practical Management of Pain was described in The New England Journal of Medicine as "a masterly, readable, comprehensive treatise". The third edition was recognized in Anesthesia and Analgesia as "a definitive text for the care of the pain patient. Although the fourth edition of Practical Management of Pain received criticism for being biased towards a North American readership, it was acknowledged as a "trusted reference source" for both trainees and consultants in pain medicine.

== See also ==
- Textbook of Pain
