= Tactile induced analgesia =

Tactile induced analgesia is the phenomenon where concurrent touch and pain on the skin reduces the intensity of pain that is felt.

== Somatosensory afferent fibres ==
There are four main types of sensory fibres responsible for somatosensation: Aα, Aβ, Aδ and C fibres (more details can be found at the axon page). The Aβ fibres are from cutaneous mechanoreceptors and respond to touch stimuli; the Aδ and C fibres are nociceptor afferents which respond to painful stimuli. The touch fibres have a larger diameter than the pain fibres, which means that they transmit their action potentials much faster than the smaller diameter fibres.

== Gate Control Theory ==
=== Melzack and Wall ===
The Gate Control Theory of Pain, first proposed in the 1960s by Melzack and Wall, states that the concurrent activation of tactile afferent nerve fibers inhibits activation of nociceptive afferent fibres. Melzack and Wall suggested that a gating mechanism is present in the dorsal horn of the spinal cord. They suggested that both touch and pain afferent fibres synapse on to 'projection cells' and inhibitory interneurons in the dorsal horn. It is the projection cells which then travel up the spinothalamic tract to the brain. Interactions between these connections is thought to mediate the perception of painful stimuli:

1. With no input, the inhibitory interneuron stops signals being sent to the brain from the projection neuron, i.e. the gate is closed.
2. Stimulation of large tactile afferents leads to somatosensory input. The inhibitory interneuron and projection neuron are both activated, but the inhibitory interneuron stops signals travelling to the brain via the projection neuron, i.e. the gate is closed.
3. Nociception occurs if there is greater stimulation of the smaller pain afferents. The interneuron becomes inactivated, so that the projection neuron can send signals to the brain leading to pain perception, i.e. the gate is open.

The theory shows that rubbing a painful site leads to stimulation of somatosensory input to projector neurons, which reduces the intensity of pain perceived.

=== Development of the Gate Control Theory ===
More recently neurophysiological studies in animals have indicated that the wide range dynamic neurons (WDR neurons) in the dorsal horn are the homologue of Wall and Melzack's proposed projector neurons and inhibitory interneurons. The neurons are multimodal (respond to both touch and pain input), with an inhibitory surround receptive field. Experiments looking at the WDR neurons in animals have shown that a strong tactile stimulus in the peripheral inhibitory field could reduce the response to a painful stimulus to the same extent as a weak tactile stimulus closer to the centre of the receptive field. These data show the Gate Control Theory of Pain was correct in the prediction that activation of large tactile afferent fibres inhibit the nociceptive afferent signal being transmitted to the brain.

== Interactions between touch and pain ==
The interactions between touch and pain are mostly inhibitory (as is predicted by the Gate Control Theory). Research shows that there both acute and chronic pain perception is influenced by touch, with both psychophysical changes and differences in brain activation.

=== Touch and acute pain ===
The intensity of pain reported is consistently reduced in response to touch. This occurs whether the touch is at the same time as the pain, or even if the touch occurs before the pain. Touch also reduces the activation of cortical areas that respond to painful stimuli.

=== Touch and chronic pain ===
Individuals suffering from chronic pain tend to show reduced tactile sensitivity in the affected area. This means that they find it more difficult to distinguish whether there is one or two tactile points on the skin surface when the points are very close together. If patients are trained on the task of discriminating between two tactile points, it is shown that participants report reduced intensity of chronic pain.
