= Specific rate duty =

A specific rate duty is a tariff levied on imports, defined in terms of a specific amount per unit, such as cents per kilogram. By contrast, an ad valorem duty is a charge levied on imports defined in terms of a fixed percentage of value.
