= Site-specific =

Site-specific may refer to:

- Site-specific art
- Site-specific recombination, in molecular biology
- Site-specific theatre
