= Species (disambiguation) =

A species is one of the basic units of biological classification.

Species may also refer to:

== Films ==
The Species film series

- Species (franchise)
  - Species (film), a 1995 science fiction/horror film
  - Species II, the sequel to Species
  - Species III, a direct-to-video sequel to Species II
  - Species – The Awakening, a Sci-Fi channel direct-to-video sequel to Species III

== Music ==
- Species (EP), by Japanese metal band Crossfaith
- Species counterpoint, a way of teaching counterpoint

== Other ==
- Cloud species, in meteorology, the taxonomic rank below the genus level of cloud classification
- Chemical species, a common name for atoms, molecules, molecular fragments, ions, etc.
- Combinatorial species, an abstract, systematic method for analysing discrete structures in terms of generating functions
- Mineral species, minerals that differ in chemical composition and/or crystal structure
- Species, the forms (bread and wine) of the Eucharist, especially in discussion of transubstantiation

== See also ==
- Species problem, a mixture of difficult, related questions that often come up when biologists identify species
- Specie (disambiguation), an unrelated term used to refer to coins
