= Asset specificity =

Asset specificity is a term related to the inter-party relationships of a transaction. It is usually defined as the extent to which the investments made to support a particular transaction have a higher value to that transaction than they would have if they were redeployed for any other purpose. Asset specificity has been extensively studied in a variety of management and economics areas such as marketing, accounting, organizational behavior and management information systems.

== Overview ==
The concept of asset specificity is closely related to that of opportunism. Classical economists assume the existence of the "perfectly rational economic man". Previous approaches to economics often assumed that two contractually bounded firms will stick to the contract as they are supposed to. However, recent scholars led by Oliver E. Williamson (1975, 1985) stressed the issue of opportunism. A party to a transaction could be opportunistic by producing poor quality goods, delivering products late, or by not following through with provisions of a contract. Another key element of Williamson's scholarship is the idea of "bounded rationality". Bounded rationality is defined as a semistrong form of rationality in which actors are assumed to be intendedly rational, but only to a limited extent. Human beings have limited access to knowledge and a limited ability to process the knowledge we have access to. Therefore, actors will behave rationally, but within the limits of their capacity. Williamson argued that the two most important dimensions of business behavior are the problems of imperfect competition and the propensity to act opportunistically. "Asset specificity" becomes an issue because of opportunism.

== Definition ==
Asset specificity is usually defined as the extent to which the investments made to support a particular transaction have a higher value to that transaction than they would have if they were redeployed for any other purpose (McGuinness 1994). Williamson (1975, 1985, 1986) argued that transaction-specific assets are non-redeployable physical and human investments that are specialized and unique to a task. For example the production of a certain component may require investment in specialized equipment, the distribution of a certain product may necessitate unique physical facilities, or the delivery of a certain service may be predicated on the existence of an uncommon set of professional know-how and skills.

Basically, asset specificity refers to the extent to which a party is "tied in" in a two-way or multiple-way business relationship. For example, learning to speak English, one of the most widely understood languages of the world, is a highly asset-unspecific investment, since your investment will be likely to have equal returns (being able to communicate with others) across a variety of different settings. On the other hand, learning to speak Navajo, a rare Athabaskan language spoken in the southwest United States, could be highly asset-specific (human asset-specific, specifically), since your investment return (being able to communicate with others) is high with the few Navajo-speaking people, but almost zero otherwise.

Originally asset specificity is proposed mainly in a buyer-seller situation, where the buyer is the party that does not hold the specific assets and the seller is the party that holds the specific assets. For example, in Williamson's (1983) model, the hold-up is unilateral: the buyer holds up the seller. However later researchers have realized that asset specificity could be bilateral, or even multi-lateral. For example Joskow (1988) and Klein (1988) noted that even in a traditional buyer-seller situation, the hold up is bilateral because the buyer (the party that does not hold the specific assets) has exit cost associated with time and searching investment if he decides to switch party.

== Multidimensionality ==
Scholars have acknowledged the multidimensional property of asset specificity. For example, Williamson (1983) identified four dimensions of asset specificity:

- Site specificity, e.g. a natural resource available at a certain location and movable only at great cost;
- Physical asset specificity, e.g. a specialized machine tool or complex computer system designed for a single purpose;
- Human asset specificity, i.e., highly specialized human skills, arising in a learning by doing fashion; and
- Dedicated assets, i.e. a discrete investment in a plant that cannot readily be put to work for other purposes.
- Brand Name Capital (Williamson 1987)

Malone et al. (1987) made an important addition to the above list:

- Time specificity, an asset is time specific if its value is highly dependent on its reaching the user within a specified, relatively limited period of time.

Joskow (1988) pointed out that these different categories point to essentially the same phenomenon, but that it is instructive in empirical analyses to treat each category distinctly. Joskow's series of papers have looked at contract structuring in order to examine how contracts mitigate transaction costs inherent in a market based relationship

Zaheer and Venkatraman (1994) acknowledge four asset specificity dimensions: site, human, physical, and dedicated assets. In addition, they define two dimensions of asset specificity in their study: human asset specificity and the newly developed "procedural asset specificity", where

- Human asset specificity deals with the degree to which skills, knowledge and experience of the agency's personnel are specific to the business process.
- Procedural asset specificity incorporates notions of human asset specificity and refers to the degree that an agency's workflows and processes are customized to exploit the other party's capabilities.

Most theoretical work focus on the relationships between asset specificity and sunk cost effects, transaction costs, vertical integration, and uncertainties (e.g., see Joskow 1988, Anderson 1985, John and Weitz 1988, and Whyte 1994).

== Operationalization ==
Asset specificity is usually operationalized using one of the following schemes.

Anderson and Coughlan (1987): five items. Questions 2 and 3 refer to the type and duration of training you supply to employees of the firms that purchase your product.

1. How much training at the sales office do you provide to salesmen who handle your product? 0, 1, 2, 3, 4, 5 (0 = no training, 5 = very high level of training)
2. How much training do you give employees of purchasers at their installation? 0, 1, 2, 3, 4, 5 (0 = very little training, 5 = very high level of training)
3. How much training do you give employees of purchasers in your U.S. facilities? 0, 1, 2, 3, 4, 5 (0 = very little training, 5 = very high level of training)
4. How many years of education do you require for sales employees to be qualified to handle this product? (Example: bachelor's degree coded as 16 years of education)
5. How much sales experience do you require for salesmen to handle this product? (coded as the number of months of experience required)

Klein et al. (1990): six items, 7-point scale (1 = completely disagree, 7 = completely agree).

1. It is difficult for an outsider to learn our ways of doing things.
2. To be effective, a salesman has to take a lot of time to get to know the customers.
3. It takes a long time for a salesman to learn about this product thoroughly.
4. A salesman's inside information on our procedures would be very helpful to our competitors.
5. Specialized facilities are needed to market this product.
6. A large investment in equipment and facilities is needed to market this product.

Zaheer and Venkatraman (1994): three items, 7-point scale (1 = relatively similar to other carriers, 7 = significantly customized for the focal interfaced carrier). Please indicate the extent to which the following aspects of your commercial lines business of the focal carrier are relatively similar to other carriers, or are significantly different from other carriers.

1. The skill level of the employees working on the interfaced carrier's business.
2. The extent of training needed.
3. The workflows and routines of the interfaced carrier.

Christiaanse and Venkatraman (2002): two items, 7-point scale. The extent of travel agency's agreement with the following scale:

1. It has taken a lot of time and effort for us to learn the key factors of the focal carrier's organization for us to be effective.
2. Our sales people have spent much time and effort learning the skills needed to sell this specific product.

== See also ==
- Resource dependency
