= Specification (disambiguation) =

Specification may refer to:

- Specification is the term used for the first stage in cellular differentiation
- Specification (technical standard), an explicit set of requirements
- Specification (legal concept), from Roman Law
- Formal specification, describing computer software by mathematical means
  - Specification language
- Model specification, the practice of translating theory into a statistical model
- Patent specification, part of a patent application
- Regional specification, identifying different areas of the early embryo in biology
