= Patrick D. Wall =

British neuroscientist

Pat Wall FRS
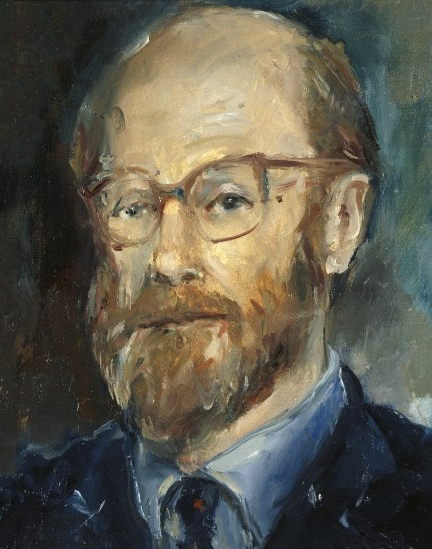
- Portrait painting of Patrick David Wall
- Born: Patrick David Wall; 25 April 1925; Nottingham, Nottinghamshire, England
- Died: 8 August 2001 (aged 76); Cork, Munster, Ireland
- Education: St Paul's School, London
- Alma mater: University of Oxford
- Known for: Gate control theory of pain
- Awards: Royal Medal (1999)
- Scientific career
- Fields: Neuroscience
- Workplaces: Yale School of Medicine; University of Chicago; Hebrew University of Jerusalem; Harvard University; Massachusetts Institute of Technology; University College London
- Doctoral students: Maria Fitzgerald

Patrick David Wall (25 April 1925 – 8 August 2001) FRS was a British neuroscientist described as 'the world's leading expert on pain' and best known for the gate control theory of pain.

== Early life and education ==
Wall was born in Nottingham on 25 April 1925 to Thomas Wall, the director of education for Middlesex, and his wife Ruth Cresswell. He was educated at St Paul's School, London and the University of Oxford, studying medicine at Christ Church, Oxford, where he became interested in pain. He published his first two papers, in the prominent science journals Brain and Nature, at the age of 21. While at Oxford he had also helped found the British Medical Students' Journal, partially to help campaign for the introduction of the National Health Service (NHS). He graduated in 1948, by which time he had published three papers in prominent science journals.

== Career and research ==
After graduating, he spent a short time treating holocaust survivors and refugees in mainland Europe, and then moved to the United States where he took up a position as an instructor at the Yale School of Medicine investigating the use of lobotomies as a method of controlling depression.

Wall remained as an instructor until 1950, when he was offered a position as an assistant professor at the University of Chicago. He moved again in 1953 to serve as an instructor at Harvard University, and again in 1957 to work as an associate professor at the Massachusetts Institute of Technology. He was promoted to full professor in 1960, and while at the Institute met Ronald Melzack, who was to become a long-time collaborator. At Melzack's urging they wrote a paper on the Gate control theory of pain and published it in Brain in 1962; according to Wall it was read by around three people. After expanding and rewriting the article they republished it as Pain Mechanisms: a new theory in Science in 1965 where it drew wider attention, which initially met with skepticism. The paper was looked at in a new light after Wall collaborated with Bill Sweet to produce the Transcutaneous Electrical Nerve Stimulator, developed along the lines of the theory. The effective working of the device validated Wall and Melzack's paper, and contributed to Wall’s recognition as a leading neuroscientist. In 1965 he published TRIO - The Revolting Intellectuals' Organisation, a thriller novel. In 1973 he acted as the scientific study officer for the launch of the International Association for the Study of Pain, and subsequently acted as the first editor of its medical journal, Pain.

=== Return to UK ===
In 1967, he returned to Britain due to threats from the CIA that refusal to disclose the political affiliations of his research group could jeopardise his funding, and took up a position as Professor of Anatomy at University College London, under JZ Young. While there he was given the nickname of "Mr Pat". His reputation drew many students and researchers to UCL, and his lectures were noted for their popularity. In 1972 he travelled to Jerusalem, and subsequently held a chair at the Hebrew University of Jerusalem, where he taught for several months a year.

In 1982 he published The Challenge of Pain with Melzack followed by a second collaboration a year later with The Textbook of Pain, which is currently in its sixth edition. He was elected a Fellow of the Royal Society of Physicians in 1984 and the Royal Society in 1989; by this point he had been repeatedly short-listed for a Nobel Prize. His left-wing views and the enemies that came with them were an apparent reason for his overdue election as a Fellow of the Royal Society, along with the society's reluctance to elect medical officials. He was awarded the Sherrington Medal of the Royal Society of Medicine in 1988, and in 1992 he was also elected a fellow of the Royal Society of Anaesthesiologists. He retired the same year and continued experimental research at St Thomas's Hospital Medical School. In 1999 he was awarded the Royal Medal 'in recognition of his fundamental contributions to our knowledge of the somatosensory system and, in particular, pain mechanisms'.

== Personal life ==
Wall was married three times; first to Betty Tucker on 10 August 1950, an artist and poet whom he divorced in 1973, second to Vera Ronnen on 26 August 1976, an artist from Jerusalem whom he also divorced and finally to Mary McLellan on 6 May 1999. Wall was a chain-smoker, and enjoyed bird-watching outside of his work, although he preferred not to talk about his personal life. An exception to this was politics; Wall was fervently left-wing, and had set up various student and other organisations to support various causes.

In 1996 he was diagnosed with prostate cancer after collapsing while on holiday in Cork. After treatment he went into remission, which held for five years; the cancer returned in 2001, and after a kidney operation on 2 August he discharged himself on 8 August so he could die at home. While suffering from cancer he had published the book Pain: The Science of Suffering. His body was left for medical dissection.
