= Specialty =

Specialty or speciality may refer to:

- Deed, a contract in law
- Index of speciality, a geometrical invariant
- Speciality (album), an album by J-Pop singer Nami Tamaki
- Specialty (medicine), a field within medicine
- Specialty (dentistry), a field within dentistry
- Specialty food, high-quality food produced in small quantities
- Specialty Records, a record label
- Specialty show, a dog show of a single breed
