= Ronald Melzack =

Canadian psychologist

Ronald Melzack OC OQ FRSC
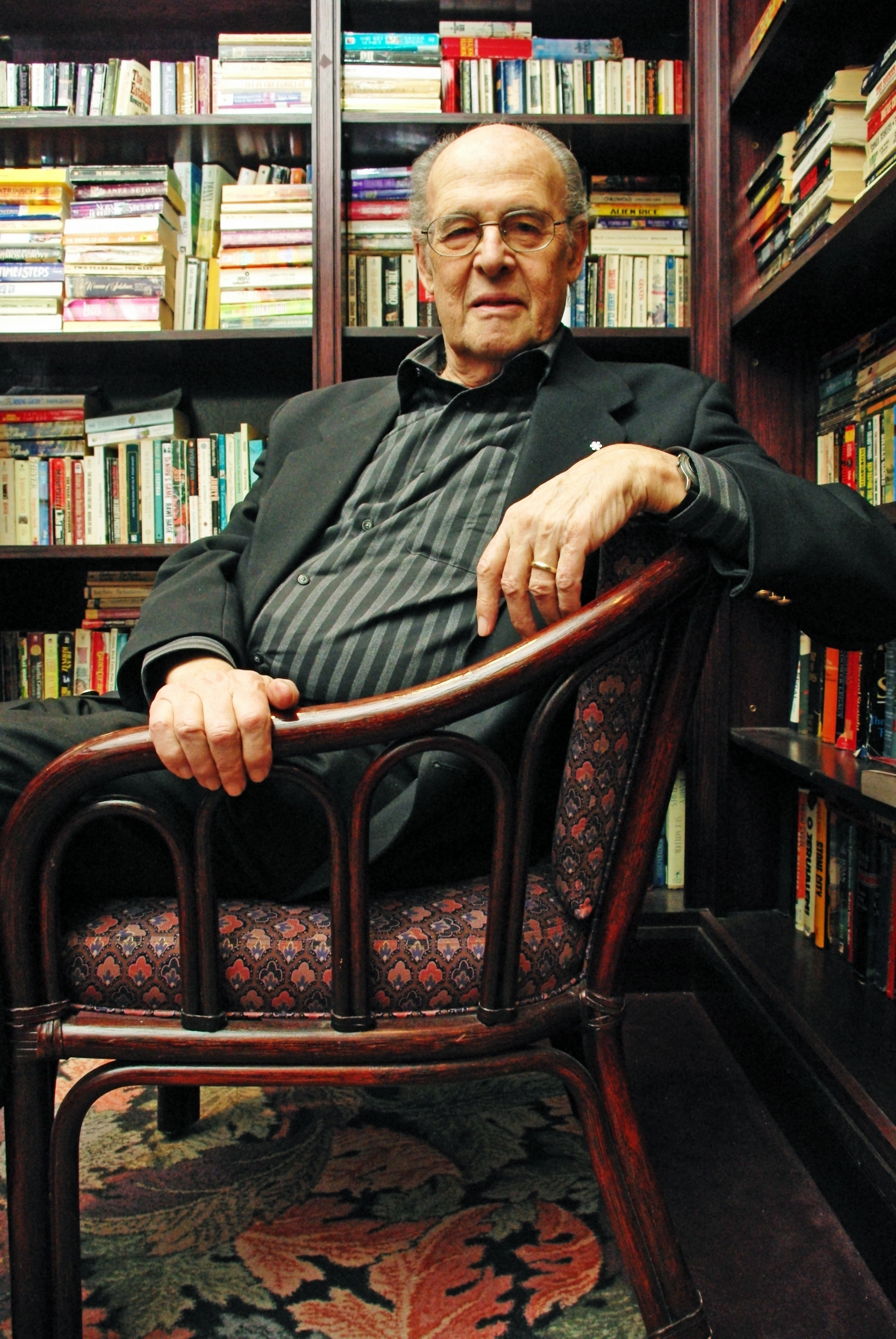
- Born: July 19, 1929; Montreal, Quebec, Canada
- Died: December 22, 2019 (aged 90); Montreal, Quebec, Canada
- Education: McGill University
- Occupations: Psychologist, Professor

Ronald Melzack OC OQ FRSC (July 19, 1929 – December 22, 2019) was a Canadian psychologist and professor of psychology at McGill University. In 1965, he and Patrick David Wall re-charged pain research by introducing the gate control theory of pain. In 1968, Melzack published an extension of the gate control theory, in which he asserted that pain is subjective and multidimensional because several parts of the brain contribute to it at the same time. During the mid-1970s, he developed the McGill Pain Questionnaire and became a founding member of the International Association for the Study of Pain. He also became the founding editor of Wall & Melzack's Textbook of Pain.

Melzack has received numerous honors including Prix du Québec (1994), the Order of Canada (1995), and the National Order of Quebec (2000). In 2010, he won the Grawemeyer Award for his research on the science of pain.

== Early life ==
Melzack was born in Montreal, the son of Joseph Melzack, who worked in a clothing factory and opened a second-hand bookstore. He grew up in a working-class Jewish neighborhood. Due to financial constraint, Ron was the only sibling in his family to attend university. His brothers worked in the family bookstore known as "Classic Bookshops" which became a successful chain. He received his M.Sc. from McGill in 1951 and his Ph.D. from McGill in 1954. Donald O. Hebb was Melzack's research advisor at university during the time he worked on his doctoral thesis. Hebb was doing experiments with dogs who had not been normally socialized and Melzack became interested in their unusual response to pain when they would stick their nose in a flame repeatedly. Melzack completed his post-doc at the University of Oregon.

== Career ==
After studying for his Ph.D. in 1954 with Hebb at McGill University in Montreal, he began to work with patients who suffered from "phantom limb" pain — people who feel pain in an arm or leg that has been removed. He found that pain often has little survival value, and some pains are entirely out of proportion to the degree of tissue damage, sometimes continuing long after injured tissues have healed. While still a postdoctoral student, Melzack began collecting "pain words" and putting them into classes that belonged together, like "hot," "burning," "scalding," and "searing".

In 1975, this pursuit led to the development of the McGill Pain Questionnaire, now used in pain clinics and cancer hospices around the world. Melzack spent time at the University College of London, and the University of Pisa in Italy. He eventually became a faculty member at the Massachusetts Institute of Technology (MIT) where he met Dr. Patrick Wall. The two shared similar thoughts and ideas surrounding the phenomenon of pain. Melzack and Wall noticed that some individuals felt immense pain when damage to the body was minimal, and some people with traumatic injuries experienced little or no pain until a later time.

In 1965 at MIT, Melzack and Wall developed the gate control theory of pain which states that pain is "gated" or modulated by past experience. Gate control theory led to the valuable discovery of endorphins and enkephalins, the body's natural opiates. He is also noted for work on stress-induced analgesia, phantom-limb pain and the theory of neuromatrix. He proposes that we are born with a genetically determined neural network that generates the perception of the body, the sense of self, and can also generate chronic pain, even when no limbs are present.

Melzack's recent research at McGill indicates that there are two types of pain, transmitted by two separate sets of pain-signaling pathways in the central nervous system. Sudden, short-term pain, such as the pain of cutting a finger, is transmitted by a group of pathways that Melzack calls the "lateral" system, because they pass through the brain stem on one side of its central core. Prolonged pain, on the other hand, such as chronic back pain, is transmitted by the "medial" system, whose neurons pass through the central core of the brain stem.

In 1974, Melzack co-founded the first pain clinic in Canada at the Montreal General Hospital with Dr. Joseph Stratford (then Chief of Neurosurgery at the hospital and who was the medical director of the pain clinic). Melzack served as Research Director from 1974 to 2000. The clinic became part of the McGill University Health Centre which has grown to be one of the best organized centres for pain treatment in the world. Melzack also supervised graduate students at McGill, one of whom —John O'Keefe— would later go on to receive the Nobel Prize in Physiology or Medicine in 2014.

== Recognition ==
Melzack was a founding member of the International Association for the Study of Pain (IASP) and a past president as well as an honorary life member. Melzack was a Member of the Canadian Medical Hall of Fame. He was also elected a Fellow of the Royal Society of Canada (1982), holds two Canadian honorary degrees, and was the first recipient of the E.P. Taylor Chair in Pain Studies at McGill (1986). He is the author of several textbooks on pain, and was co-editor of Handbook of Pain Assessment, 1992. He has also published books of Inuit stories and won the Canada Council Molson Prize in 1985.

He received the Prix du Québec for research in pure and applied science (1994), recognizing him as a laureate of the highest honor for a scientist in his home province. In 1995, he was made an Officer of the Order of Canada. In 2000, he was made an Officer of the National Order of Quebec. Melzack has been honoured with a Killam Prize (2001). On April 29, 2009, he was inducted into the Canadian Medical Hall of Fame, in recognition of his “outstanding contributions to medical science and the improved health and well-being of people everywhere.” Melzack was the recipient of the 2010 University of Louisville Grawemeyer Award in psychology for his studies and explanation of experiencing pain. The International Association for the study of pain created the Ronald Melzack Lecture Award in 2010, in recognition of Melzack's exceptional contributions to the field of pain research. In 2011, he wrote the foreword of a Ronald Melzack special issue about the influence of the Melzack's works on understanding of pain and daily practice. Melzack's published articles include; Pain mechanisms: A new theory, published in Science magazine in November 1965, The McGill Pain Questionnaire: Major properties and scoring methods published in the journal Pain, in 1975, and re-published by Melzack in the Journal Anesthesiology, in 2005 and Pain and the neuromatrix in the brain, published in the Journal of Dental Education, in 2001.

== Sources ==
The original version of this article was based on an article from science.ca.
Great Canadian Psychology Website - Ronald Melzack Biography
