= Nociplastic pain =

Symptom

- Other names: Central sensitisation (older term)
- Fibromyalgia is the classic example of nociplastic pain, being diagnosed when pain is felt in four different quadrants of the body using measures such as the Widespread Pain Index shown
- Specialty: Pain medicine, neurology, psychiatry, orthopedics
- Duration: Short- to long-term
- Diagnostic method: Clinical history, description of pain, quantitative sensory testing
- Treatment: Exercise, medication, psychological therapies, pain neuroscience education

Nociplastic pain, formerly known as central sensitisation, is chronic pain that persists without evidence of tissue injury, resulting in and being sustained by aberrant or heightened pain signal processing of the central nervous system (CNS). It may occur in combination with the other types of pain or in isolation. The pain may be generalised or multifocal, and it can be out of proportion to any associated physical cause.

The concept and term were formally added to the taxonomy of the International Association for the Study of Pain (IASP) following the recommendation of a task force in 2017. The root terms are the Latin nocēre ('to hurt') and the Greek plastós (πλαστός), meaning "development" or "formation" in a medical context.

This type of pain typically arises in some chronic pain conditions, with the archetypal condition being fibromyalgia. Exercise, psychotherapy, and medical therapies are commonly prescribed for such conditions. Nociplastic pain has also been hypothesized to play a role in the persistence of medically unexplained symptoms.

== Definition ==
Nociplastic pain is a longterm complex pain defined by the International Association for the Study of Pain as "pain that arises from altered nociception despite no clear evidence of actual or threatened tissue damage causing the activation of peripheral nociceptors or evidence for disease or lesion of the somatosensory system causing the pain". It is the third proposed mechanism for pain. The other two mechanisms are nociceptive pain and neuropathic pain.

The terms "nociplastic pain" and "central sensitization" are sometimes used interchangeably. However, more recent articles argue that central sensitization is one of the significant mechanisms that contributes to nociplastic pain. Central sensitization is a broader term referring to a hyperexcitability of the nervous system, usually including hyperalgesia (increased sensitivity to pain), and allodynia (painful perception of non-painful stimuli).

Syndromes that are characterized by central nervous system excitability are referred to as central sensitivity syndromes, such as fibromyalgia.

== Proposed mechanisms ==
The causes of nociplastic pain are not fully understood and are still being investigated, but it is thought to be a dysfunction of the central nervous system's processing of pain signals, which may have become distorted or sensitised. There are a variety of proposed mechanisms for nociplastic pain, such as increased integration between parts of the brain responsible for emotion, sensory processing, and attention, increased levels of pain-inciting neurotransmitters, increased immune activity in the central and peripheral nervous systems, and alteration in muscle structure, such as the formation of myofascial trigger points. Specific central nervous system locations that have been suggested to be the location of the dysfunction are nociceptive neurons, spinal and supraspinal structures, the dorsal horn, and others.

There is research suggesting that chronic pain syndromes, such as irritable bowel syndrome, can potentially be triggered by viral illnesses (e.g., COVID-19) or bacterial infections in some patient populations. It is theorized that infections may increase levels of inflammatory cytokines, leading to pain receptor hypersensitization and the development of nociplastic pain. However, more research is needed to explore and confirm the link between infections and chronic pain development as much of the data is self-reported.

== Presentation ==
Nociplastic pain is characterized by pain that is isolated to one bodily region or widespread to several bodily regions, along with a poor response to conventional painkillers. The painful area(s) may experience pain out of proportion to temperature stimuli and applied pressure. While the pain often manifests somatically (e.g., chronic back pain), it can also present viscerally (e.g., chronic primary bladder pain syndrome has been shown to potentially have a nociplastic pain component). There may be additional CNS-associated symptoms, such as fatigue, executive dysfunction, mood disturbances, and sleep problems. Nociplastic pain can occur on its own in conditions like tension headache or fibromyalgia or arise as a part of other pain categories, such as chronic back pain.

== Risk factors ==
While the causes of nociplastic pain are not fully understood, it is potentially associated with certain risk factors, such as being female, genetic factors, environmental factors, adverse childhood experiences, physical inactivity (i.e., during a post-operative period), a medical history positive for a depressive disorder, panic disorder or other anxiety disorders, or heightened awareness of one's bodily sensations.

== Special populations ==
Some research has found a potential correlation between having an autoimmune disease and developing fibromyalgia, the most typical condition of nociplastic pain. While it is conventionally thought that the majority of the pain in autoimmune disorders is primarily inflammatory, these studies possibly point to a nociplastic origin of pain in this population, which could improve the treatment of the debilitating pain patients with autoimmune conditions experience.

According to a 2024 review article the evidence for central sensitisation as an underlying mechanism in chronic pain conditions such as fibromyalgia has significant limitations, such as failing to demonstrate causality, and the use of measures described as measuring central sensitisation which do not measure it as a neurophysiological phenomenon, leading to circular reasoning.

== Diagnosis ==
While there is no standardized test that definitively diagnoses nociplastic pain, the diagnostic method often starts with excluding other medical conditions. The International Association for the Study of Pain (IASP) has suggested a series of clinical criteria to grade the likelihood of nociplastic pain. Among the criteria is the presence of other central nervous system disturbances such as sleep disturbances and fatigue.

Other tools to measure central sensitization include quantitative sensory testing, functional magnetic resonance imaging (fMRI), EMG, brain mapping, and measures of cytokines and neurotrophines in the blood and urine. Self-report questionnaires such as the Central Sensitization Inventory, Sensory Hypersensitivity Scale, and painDETECT are also used.

== Treatment ==
The treatment of nociplastic pain is often multifaceted. Treatment generally requires both physical and psychological therapies, pain neuroscience education, and sometimes pharmacological therapy.

There are multiple modalities of non-pharmacological treatment available that can help manage nociplastic pain. Exercise is commonly recommended because regular exercise increases the release of mood-elevating neurotransmitters and decreases inflammatory cells in the central nervous system. Transcutaneous electrical nerve stimulation (TENS) also helps to reduce pain by acting on inhibitory spinal cord receptors and activating pain-reducing receptors in the brain. Psychotherapy can also help patients with nociplastic pain to retrain their interpretation of and reaction to pain, improving quality of life.

Pharmacological treatment of nociplastic pain remains complex. Conventional pain management medications such as NSAIDs and opioids have shown limited usefulness in managing nociplastic pain. Currently, serotonin–norepinephrine reuptake inhibitors (SNRIs) and tricyclic antidepressants (TCAs) are recommended, but their utility in managing this condition remains unclear.
