= Psychalgia =

Psychalgia may refer to:

- psychogenic pain, physical pain of psychological origin
- psychological pain, any non-physical pain
