= Mazisotine =

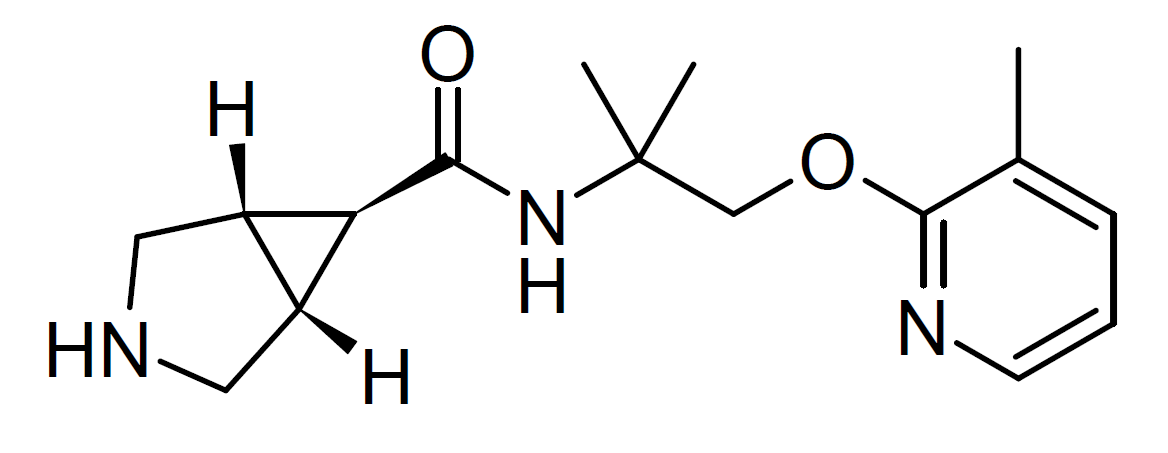

Clinical data
- Other names: LY3556050, CNTX-0290

Identifiers
- IUPAC name: (1S,5R)-N-[2-methyl-1-[(3-methyl-2-pyridinyl)oxy]propan-2-yl]-3-azabicyclo[3.1.0]hexane-6-carboxamide
- CAS Number: 1638588-92-7
- PubChem CID: 86294067
- ChemSpider: 77005706
- UNII: D3M32WP3MH
- ChEMBL: ChEMBL5874446

Chemical and physical data
- Formula: C_{16}H_{23}N_{3}O_{2}
- Molar mass: 289.379 g·mol^{−1}
- 3D model (JSmol): Interactive image
- SMILES: CC(C)(COc1ncccc1C)NC(=O)[C@H]1[C@@H]2CNC[C@H]12
- InChI: InChI=1S/C16H23N3O2/c1-10-5-4-6-18-15(10)21-9-16(2,3)19-14(20)13-11-7-17-8-12(11)13/h4-6,11-13,17H,7-9H2,1-3H3,(H,19,20)/t11-,12+,13?; Key:PCINBSQTEDBZDB-FUNVUKJBSA-N

Mazisotine (LY3556050, CNTX-0290) is a chemical compound which acts as an agonist at somatostatin receptor 4. It has analgesic effects and has been researched for the treatment of pain associated with arthritis and neuropathic pain. It was not pursued for human medical use following disappointing results in Phase II clinical trials, but continues to be used in scientific research.

== See also ==
- J-2156
- NNC 26-9100
