= Neuropathic pain =

Pain affecting the somatosensory nervous system

- Specialty: Pain medicine, neurology
- Duration: Variable
- Causes: Damage to the nervous system resulting from diabetes mellitus, multiple sclerosis, COVID-19, infection, injury, and stroke, among others
- Risk factors: Diabetes mellitus; multiple sclerosis; exposure to neurotoxicants; alcoholism; history of chemo- and/or radiotherapy; & nutritional deficiencies, among others
- Diagnostic method: Clinical interview; quantitative sensory testing; electroneuromyography; nerve stimulation; biopsy; imaging, & patient self-rating of symptoms
- Differential diagnosis: Diabetic and metabolic neuropathy; demyelinating disease (e.g., multiple sclerosis); malignancy; spinal cord injury; primary neuralgia; mononeuritis multiplex; sciatica; pruritic processes; fibromyalgia; and functional pain syndrome, among others
- Treatment: Physical therapy; exercise; psychotherapy; antidepressants; gabapentinoids; anticonvulsants; Tramadol; neuromodulation, and topical agents, among others
- Frequency: 4.1%-12.4% (12-month prevalence, US adults)

Neuropathic pain is pain caused by a lesion or disease of the somatosensory nervous system. Neuropathic pain may be associated with abnormal sensations called dysesthesia (including paresthesia and hypoesthesia) from normally non-painful stimuli (allodynia). It may have continuous and/or episodic (paroxysmal) components. The latter resemble stabbings or electric shocks. Common qualities include burning or coldness, "pins and needles" sensations, numbness and itching.

The pain may result from disorders of the peripheral nervous system or the central nervous system (brain and spinal cord). Neuropathic pain may occur in isolation or in combination with other forms of pain. Medical treatments focus on identifying the underlying cause and relieving pain. In cases of peripheral neuropathy, the pain may progress to insensitivity.

Up to 7–8% of the European population is affected by neuropathic pain, and in 5% of persons it may be severe.

== Diagnosis ==
Quantitative sensory testing may assist with diagnosis of specific deficits

Diagnosis of pain conditions relies on the character of the pain with a sharp stabbing character and the presence of particular features such as mechanical allodynia and cold allodynia. Neuropathic pain also tends to affect defined dermatomes and there may be limits to the area of pain. For neuropathic pain, clinicians look for an underlying lesion to the nervous system or an inciting cause consistent with the development of neuropathic pain. The obvious presence of an underlying feature or cause is not always detectable, and response to treatment may be used as a surrogate particularly in cases where diagnosis of the underlying lesion leaves the patient in pain for a prolonged period of time. MRI may be helpful in the identification of underlying lesions, reversible causes or serious underlying conditions such as primary presentation of a tumor or multiple sclerosis. Quantitative sensory testing (QST), a system of detailed analysis of the somatosensory system, is frequently used in research situations to identify neuropathic pain and a more detailed analysis of its components. It has been suggested by some authorities that QST may have a future role in the diagnosis of neuropathic pain and in particular the identification of neuropathic pain subtypes. Neuropathic pain can occur alone or in combination with other types of pain. The identification of neuropathic pain components is important as different classes of analgesic are required.

The gold standard for diagnosing small fiber neuropathy as the etiology of neuropathic pain is skin biopsy. Sudomotor assessment, through electrochemical skin conductance, an accurate objective technique, could be considered as a good screening tool to limit skin biopsy in patients in whom it is not suitable.

=== Differential diagnosis ===
Symptoms of neuropathic pain can be caused by brain conditions that are deemed to be psychiatric/psychological rather than neurological. Such conditions include somatic symptom disorder triggered by anxiety, and alcohol and other drug withdrawal.

== Causes ==
Neuropathic pain may be divided into peripheral, central or mixed (peripheral and central) types.

Central neuropathic pain is found in spinal cord injury, multiple sclerosis, migraine, thalamus stroke, meningioma, Dejerine–Roussy syndrome, variant Creutzfeldt–Jakob disease and late-onset GM2 gangliosidosis.

Peripheral neuropathies are commonly caused by diabetes (~30%), metabolic disorders, herpes zoster infection (postherpic neuralgia), HIV-related neuropathies, nutritional deficiencies, toxins, remote manifestations of malignancies, immune mediated disorders and physical trauma to a nerve trunk. Neuropathic pain is common in cancer as a direct result of cancer on peripheral nerves (e.g., compression by a tumor). It is also common as an adverse effect of chemotherapy (chemotherapy-induced peripheral neuropathy), radiotherapy, and surgery. Peripheral neuropathic pain can also be associated with Lyme disease, fibromyalgia, complex regional pain syndrome, trigeminal neuralgia, scalp dysesthesia, Fabry disease and stem cells used to treat nerve damage.

Neurofibromatosis type II is associated with both central and peripheral neuropathic pain.

== Comorbidities ==
Neuropathic pain has profound physiological effects on the brain, which can manifest as psychological disorders. Rodent models in which the social effects of chronic pain can be isolated from other factors suggest that induction of chronic pain can cause anxiety-depressive symptoms and that particular circuits in the brain have a direct connection. Depression and neuropathic pain may have a bidirectional relationship, and relief of co-morbid depression may underlie some of the therapeutic efficacy of antidepressants in neuropathic pain. Neuropathic pain has important effects on social well-being that should not be ignored. People with neuropathic pain may have difficulty working exhibiting higher levels of presenteeism, absenteeism and unemployment, exhibit higher levels of substance misuse (which may be related to attempted self-medication), and present difficulties with social interactions. Moreover, uncontrolled neuropathic pain is a significant risk factor for suicide. Certain classes of neuropathic pain may cause serious adverse effects necessitating hospital admission. For instance, trigeminal neuralgia can present as a severe crisis wherein the patient may have difficulty talking, eating, and drinking. As neuropathic pain may be comorbid with cancer, it can have important dose limiting effects on certain classes of chemotherapeutic.

== Treatments ==
Neuropathic pain can be very difficult to treat, with only some 40–60% of people achieving partial relief.

=== General approach ===
First-line treatments include certain antidepressants (tricyclic antidepressants and serotonin–norepinephrine reuptake inhibitors) and anticonvulsants (pregabalin and gabapentin). Opioid analgesics are recognized as useful in some cases but not recommended as first-line treatments. A broader range of treatments is used in specialist care. There is limited data and guidance for the long-term treatment of pain. Notably, strong evidence from randomized controlled trials is not universal for all interventions.

=== Primary interventions ===
==== Anticonvulsants ====
Pregabalin and gabapentin may reduce pain associated with diabetic neuropathy. The anticonvulsants carbamazepine and oxcarbazepine are especially effective in trigeminal neuralgia. Carbamazepine is a voltage-gated sodium channel inhibitor and reduces neuronal excitability by preventing depolarization. Carbamazepine is most commonly prescribed to treat trigeminal neuralgia due to clinical experience and early clinical trials showing strong efficacy. Gabapentin may reduce symptoms associated with neuropathic pain or fibromyalgia in some people. There is no test to predict the effectiveness of gabapentin for individuals, so a short trial is suggested to assess its effectiveness. While 62% of users may experience at least one adverse event, serious adverse events are rare.

A meta-analysis of randomized clinical trials suggests that lamotrigine is not useful for most patients, although it may have been used in the treatment of refractory cases.

==== Antidepressants ====
Dual serotonin-norepinephrine reuptake inhibitors in particular duloxetine, as well as tricyclic antidepressants in particular amitriptyline, and nortriptyline are considered first-line medications for this condition.

==== Opioids ====
Opioids, while commonly used in chronic neuropathic pain, are not recommended as first- or second-line treatment. In the short and long term, they are of unclear benefit. However, clinical experience suggests that opioids like tramadol may be useful for treating sudden-onset severe pain. In the intermediate term, low-quality evidence supports utility.

Several opioids, particularly levorphanol, methadone, and ketobemidone, possess NMDA receptor antagonism in addition to their μ-opioid agonist properties. Methadone does so because it is a racemic mixture; only the l-isomer is a potent μ-opioid agonist. The d-isomer does not have opioid agonist action and acts as an NMDA receptor antagonist; d-methadone is an analgesic in experimental models of chronic pain.

There is little evidence to indicate that one potent opioid is more effective than another. Expert opinion leans toward the use of methadone for neuropathic pain, in part because of its NMDA antagonism. It is reasonable to base the choice of opioid on other factors. It is unclear if fentanyl gives pain relief to people with neuropathic pain. The potential pain relief benefits of strong opioids must be weighed against their significant addiction potential under normal clinical use, and some authorities suggest that they should be reserved for cancer pain. Importantly, recent observational studies suggest a pain-relief benefit in non-cancer-related chronic pain of reducing or terminating long-term opioid therapy.

=== Non-Pharmaceutical Interventions ===
Non-pharmaceutical treatments such as exercise, physical therapy, and psychotherapy may be useful adjuncts to treatment.

=== Secondary and research interventions ===
==== Botulinum toxin type A ====
Local intradermal injection of botulinum toxin type A may be helpful in chronic focal painful neuropathies. However, it causes muscle paralysis, which may impact quality of life.

==== Cannabinoids ====
Evidence for the use of cannabis based medicines is limited. Any potential utility might be offset by adverse effects.

==== Neuromodulators ====
Neuromodulation is a field of science, medicine, and bioengineering that encompasses both implantable and non-implantable technologies (electrical and chemical) for treatment purposes. Implanted devices are expensive and carry the risk of complications. Available studies have focused on conditions with different prevalences than those of neuropathic pain patients in general. More research is needed to define the range of conditions for which they might benefit.

==== Deep brain stimulation ====
The best long-term results with deep brain stimulation have been reported with targets in the periventricular/periaqueductal grey matter (79%) or the periventricular/periaqueductal grey matter plus thalamus and/or internal capsule (87%). There is a significant complication rate, which increases over time.

==== Motor cortex stimulation ====
Stimulating the primary motor cortex using electrodes placed within the skull but outside the thick protective layer known as the dura mater has been employed as a treatment for pain. The stimulation level used in this approach is lower than that required for motor activation. Unlike spinal stimulation, which often causes noticeable tingling sensations (known as paresthesia) at treatment levels, the primary effect observed with this method is simply pain relief.

==== Spinal cord stimulators ====
Spinal cord stimulators use electrodes placed adjacent to but outside the spinal cord. The overall complication rate is one-third, most commonly due to lead migration or breakage; however, advancements in the past decade have driven complication rates significantly lower. Lack of pain relief occasionally prompts device removal.

==== NMDA antagonism ====
The N-methyl-D-aspartate (NMDA) receptor seems to play a major role in neuropathic pain and in the development of opioid tolerance. Dextromethorphan is an NMDA antagonist at high doses. Experiments in both animals and humans have established that NMDA antagonists such as ketamine and dextromethorphan can alleviate neuropathic pain and reverse opioid tolerance. Unfortunately, only a few NMDA antagonists are clinically available and their use is limited by a very short half-life (ketamine), weak activity (memantine) or unacceptable side effects (dextromethorpan).

==== Intrathecal drug delivery ====
Intrathecal pumps deliver medication to the fluid-filled (subarachnoid) space surrounding the spinal cord. Opioids alone or opioids with adjunctive medication (either a local anesthetic or clonidine). Rarely are complications such as serious infection (meningitis), urinary retention, hormonal disturbance, and intrathecal granuloma formation noted with intrathecal infusion associated with the delivery method.

==== Photopharmacology ====
Photoswitchable analogs of the anticonvulsant drug carbamazepine have been developed to control its pharmacological activity locally and on demand using light, with the purpose of reducing adverse systemic effects. One of these compounds (carbadiazocine, based on a bridged azobenzene) has been shown to produce analgesia with noninvasive illumination in a rat model of neuropathic pain.

==== Conotoxins ====
Ziconotide is a voltage-gated calcium channel blocker which may be used in severe cases of ongoing neuropathic pain it is delivered intrathecally.

==== Ambroxol ====
Ambroxol is a medication that reduces mucus production. Preclinical research suggests it may produce analgesic effects by blocking sodium channels in sensory neurons.

==== Gene therapy ====
The use of gene therapy is a potential treatment for chronic neuropathic pain. In animals, a gene therapy for local transgenes encoding for GABA synthesizing-releasing inhibitory machinery was effective for months at a time. It increases synaptically GABA-mediated neuronal inhibition in the spinal cord (or brain) via the induced expression of genes GAD65 and VGAT without any detected systemic or segmental side effects.

==== Topical agents ====
In some forms of neuropathy, the topical application of local anesthetics such as lidocaine may provide relief. A transdermal patch containing lidocaine is available commercially in some countries.

Repeated topical applications of capsaicin are followed by a prolonged period of reduced skin sensibility, referred to as desensitization or nociceptor inactivation. Capsaicin causes reversible degeneration of epidermal nerve fibers. Notably the capsaicin used for the relief of neuropathic pain is a substantially higher concentration than capsaicin creams available over the counter, there is no evidence that over the counter capsaicin cream can improve neuropathic pain and topical capsaicin can itself induce pain.

=== Surgical interventions ===
Orthopaedic interventions are frequently used to correct underlying pathology, which may contribute to neuropathic pain. Many orthopaedic procedures have more limited evidence. Historically, neurosurgeons have attempted lesions of regions of the brain, spinal cord, and peripheral nervous system. Whilst they cause some short-term analgesia, these are considered to be universally ineffective.

Suppose neuropathic pain arises as nerve compression syndrome. In that case, it may be treatable with a nerve decompression. When nerves are subject to chronic pressure, they exhibit a pathological progression resulting in reversible and partially reversible nerve injuries that cause pain, paresthesias, and potentially muscle weakness. In a nerve decompression, a surgeon explores the entrapment site and removes tissue around the nerve to relieve pressure. In many cases the potential for nerve recovery (full or partial) after decompression is excellent, as chronic nerve compression is associated with low-grade nerve injury (Sunderland classification I-III) rather than high-grade nerve injury (Sunderland classification IV-V). Nerve decompressions are associated with a significant reduction in pain, in some cases the complete elimination of pain.

For patients with diabetic neuropathy, which affects 30% of diabetes patients, and superimposed nerve compression, nerve decompression may be useful. The theory behind the procedure is that diabetic peripheral neuropathy (DPN) predisposes peripheral nerves to compression at anatomic sites of narrowing, and that the majority of peripheral DPN symptoms may actually be attributable to nerve compression rather than DPN itself. The surgery is associated with lower pain scores, higher two-point discrimination (a measure of sensory improvement), lower rate of ulcerations, fewer falls (in the case of lower extremity decompression), and fewer amputations.

=== Alternative therapies ===
==== Herbal products ====
There is no good evidence that herbal products (nutmeg or St John's wort) are helpful in treating neuropathic pain.

==== Dietary supplements ====
A 2007 review of studies found that injected (parenteral) administration of alpha lipoic acid (ALA) was found to reduce the various symptoms of peripheral diabetic neuropathy. While some studies on orally administered ALA had suggested a reduction in both the positive symptoms of diabetic neuropathy (dysesthesia including stabbing and burning pain) as well as neuropathic deficits (paresthesia), the meta-analysis showed "more conflicting data whether it improves sensory symptoms or just neuropathic deficits alone". There is some limited evidence that ALA is also helpful in some other non-diabetic neuropathies.

Benfotiamine is an oral prodrug of Vitamin B1 that has several placebo-controlled double-blind trials proving efficacy in treating neuropathy and various other diabetic comorbidities.

== History ==
The history of pain management dates back to ancient times. Galen also suggested nerve tissue as the transferring route of pain to the brain through the invisible, psychic pneuma. The idea of origination of pain from the nerve itself, without any exciting pathology in other organs, is presented by medieval medical scholars such as Rhazes, Haly Abbas and Avicenna. They named this type of pain specifically as "vaja al asab" (nerve originated pain), described its numbness, tingling and needling qualities, and discussed its etiology and differentiating characteristics. The first formal description of neuralgia was made by John Fothergill (1712–1780). In a medical article entitled "Clinical Lecture on Lead Neuropathy" (published in 1924), the word "neuropathy" was used for the first time by Gordon.

== Proposed mechanistic basis for neuropathic pain ==
The underlying pathophysiology of neuropathic pain remains a contested topic. The etiology and mechanism of pain are related to the cause of the pain. Some forms of neuropathic pain are associated with lesions to the central nervous system, such as thalamic pain associated with lesions (resulting from, for instance, cerebrovascular events) to the thalamus, whereas other forms of pain have a peripheral inciting injury, such as those precipitating traumatic neuropathies. The cause of neuropathy affects its mechanisms, involving different tissues and cells. The exact pathways of neuropathic pain and the relative contributions of each pathway remain matters of controversy. Notably, current understanding relies mainly on rodent models because studying pain-originating tissues in living humans is difficult.

=== Peripheral ===
With peripheral nervous system lesions, several processes may occur. Intact neurons may become unusually sensitive, developing spontaneous pathological activity and abnormal excitability.

During neuropathic pain, ectopic activity arises in peripheral nociceptors, which appears to be partly due to changes in ion channel expression at the peripheral level. There may be an increase in the expression or activity of voltage-gated sodium and calcium channels, which will support the generation of action potentials. There may also be a decrease in potassium channels, which generally oppose the generation of action potentials. These changes appear to support increased excitability, which may allow endogenous stimuli to cause spontaneous pain.

=== Central ===
The central mechanisms of neuropathic pain involve several major pathways. Nociception is ordinarily transduced by a polysynaptic path through the spinal cord, up the spinothalamic tract to the thalamus, and then to the cerebral cortex. Broadly speaking, in neuropathic pain, neurons are hypersensitized, glia become activated, and inhibitory tone is lost.

==== Pain gates ====
Gate control theory of pain

The gate control theory of pain, initially proposed by Patrick David Wall and Ronald Melzack in 1965, is a major theory of pain perception. The theory posits that the activation of central pain-inhibitory neurons by non-pain-sensing neurons prevents the transmission of non-harmful stimuli to pain centers in the brain. A loss of inhibitory neurons, accompanied by reduced GAD65/67 expression (the enzymes responsible for synthesizing GABA, the predominant inhibitory neurotransmitter in the adult brain), has been observed in certain systems following peripheral neuropathy, such as in rats and mice. However, these observations remain controversial, with some investigators unable to detect a change. The loss of inhibitory inputs may allow fibers to transmit messages via the spinothalamic tract, thus causing pain in normally painless stimuli. This loss of inhibition may not be limited to the spinal cord; a loss of GABA has also been observed in the thalamus of chronic pain patients.

==== Glia ====
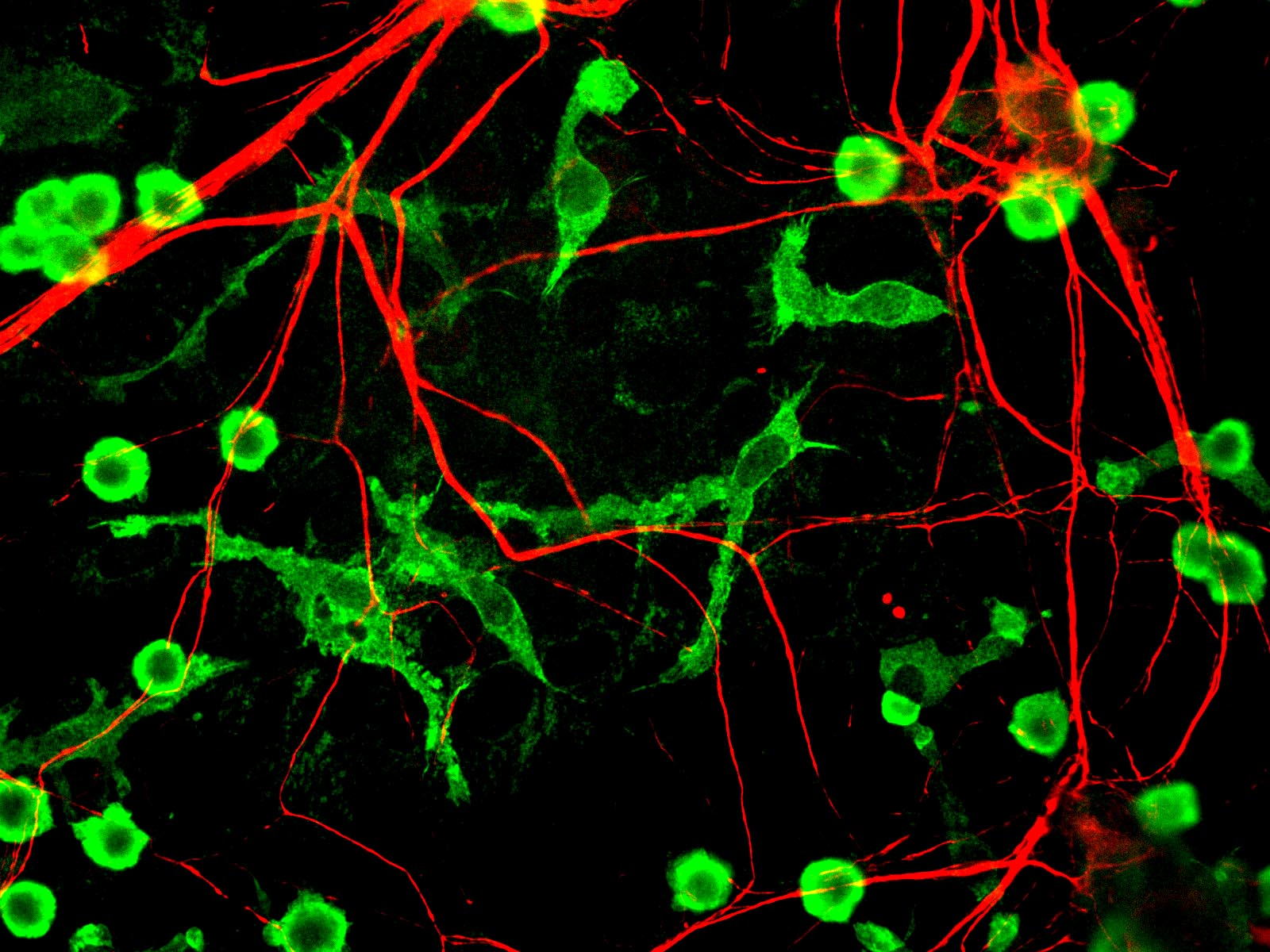
Microglia (identified by alpha-coronin1a), and neurons in culture. Microglia are proposed to release molecules that alter the excitability of neurons.

During neuropathic pain, the glia become "activated," leading to the release of proteins that modulate neural activity. The activation of glia remains an area of intense interest for researchers. Microglia, the immune cells that reside in the brain and spinal cord, respond to external signals. The source of these cues may include neurons secreting chemokines such as CCL21 and surface-immobilized chemokines such as CX3CL1. Other glia, such as astrocytes and oligodendrocytes, may also release these extrinsic cues for microglia, and microglia themselves may produce proteins that amplify the response. The effect of microglia on neurons that leads to the neurons being sensitized is controversial. Brain-derived neurotrophic factors, prostaglandins, TNF, and IL-1β may be produced by microglia, leading to changes in neurons that result in hyperexcitability.

==== Central sensitization ====
Central sensitization is a potential component of neuropathic pain. It refers to a change in synaptic plasticity, efficacy, and intrinsic disinhibition, resulting in the uncoupling of noxious inputs. In the sensitized neuron, outputs are no longer coupled to the intensity or duration, and many inputs may be combined.

==== Circuit Potentiation ====
During high-frequency stimulation, synapses conveying nociceptive information may become hyper-efficient in a process similar but not identical to long-term potentiation. Molecules such as substance P may be involved in potentiation via neurokinin receptors. NMDA activation also triggers a change in the post-synapse; it activates receptor kinases that increase receptor trafficking and post-translationally modify receptors, causing changes in their excitability.

==== Cellular ====
The phenomena described above are dependent on changes at the cellular and molecular levels. Altered expression of ion channels, changes in neurotransmitters and their receptors, and altered gene expression in response to neural input are at play. Neuropathic pain is associated with changes in sodium and calcium channel subunit expression resulting in functional changes. In chronic nerve injury, there is redistribution and alteration of subunit compositions of sodium and calcium channels, resulting in spontaneous firing at ectopic sites along the sensory pathway.

== See also ==
- Cranial nerves
- Nerve
- Neuralgia
- Neuritis
- Neuropathy
