= WDR =

WDR may refer to:

- Waddell & Reed (stock ticker: WDR), an American asset management and financial planning company
- Walt Disney Records, an American record label of the Disney Music Group
- WDR neuron, a type of neuron involved in pain signalling
- Westdeutscher Rundfunk (German: 'West German Broadcasting'), a German public-broadcasting institution
- Wet dress rehearsal, system tests of a fully integrated space launch vehicle
- Wide dynamic range, a synonym of high dynamic range and HDR
- Willo Davis Roberts (1928–2004), American writer
- World Development Report, an annual report published since 1978 by the World Bank
