= Psychogenic pain =

Medical condition

- Other names: Nociplastic pain
- Specialty: Psychiatry

Psychogenic pain is an outdated term for physical pain that was believed to be caused, increased, or prolonged by mental, emotional, or behavioral factors, without evidence of physical injury or illness.

Headache, back pain, or stomach pain were some of the most common types of pain that attracted the label “psychogenic”.

The term ‘psychogenic’ is widely considered to over-psychologise a person’s pain experience as it excludes key physical changes in the nervous system that have been found to occur in chronic pain conditions but are not visible on a scan or blood test. Such changes include increased excitability and synaptic efficacy of neurons in central nociceptive pathways (see nociplastic pain). Both physical and psychological factors can contribute to these changes in the nervous system. As such, a modern understanding of pain doesn’t label pain exclusively as physical or psychological, but utilises a biopsychosocial framework to understand the initiating and maintaining mechanisms of pain.

The International Association for the Study of Pain (IASP) defines pain as "an unpleasant sensory and emotional experience associated with, or resembling that associated with, actual or potential tissue damage." This definition was revised for the first time since 1979 in 2020, and was officially published in the ICD-11. The IASP broadens this definition to include psychogenic pain with the following points:

- Pain is always a personal experience that is influenced to varying degrees by biological, psychological, and social factors.
- Through their life experience, individuals learn the concept of pain.
- A person's report of an experience of pain should be respected.

Furthermore, the ICD-11 removed the previous classification for psychogenic pain (persistent somatoform pain disorder) from the handbook in favor of understanding pain as a combination of physical and psychosocial factors. This is reflected in the definition for chronic primary pain, which acknowledges that pain stems from multiple personal and environmental factors and should be diagnosed "independently of identified biological or psychological contributors."

Some specialists believe that psychogenic chronic pain exists as a protective distraction to keep dangerous repressed emotions such as anger or rage unconscious. It remains controversial, however, that chronic pain might arise purely from emotional causes.

== Diagnosis ==
There is no specific way of testing for psychogenic pain making it difficult to assess. There are many different criteria and factors considered for psychogenic pain diagnosis.

- Presence of pain
- Intense pain or suffering
- Impairment of everyday functions
- Symptoms ruled as unintentional
- Symptoms do not fit criteria for other potential somatic or mental disorders

== Treatment ==
For many patients a combination of psychotherapy and pharmacotherapy can help to alleviate or treat the symptoms of psychogenic pain. These treatments can include cognitive behavioral therapy, acceptance and commitment therapy, or forms commonly used for chronic pain treatments. Interventional techniques can also be used. Treatments can address underlying feelings and emotional conflicts that can lead to psychogenic pain, as well as other potential causes of dysfunction with behavior, affect, and coping that can be seen in patients. In cases where therapy and medication do not show results, some may consider surgical intervention. These surgeries target portions of the brain associated with mood disorders and pain. Deep brain stimulation (DBS) is another possible treatment that works by stimulating parts of the brain related to behavior and emotion to relieve the psychological cause of the pain.

== Controversy ==
The term "psychogenic pain" had begun to fall out of relevance in the scientific community due to its implication that the pain is entirely psychological in origin and thus not "real". The change in preferred nomenclature can be traced to 1994 when the DSM-IV removed the term in favor of the more holistic "pain disorder" section. The ICD-11 made a similar change, as mentioned above. This change is not universal and is mostly confined to the English-speaking medical community. The term psychogenic pain is still used in non-English literature.

To fill the new gap in terminology left by the declining use of psychogenic pain, the term "nociplastic pain" was coined in 2016. Nociplastic pain is defined as chronic pain that cannot be classified as nociceptive (pain caused by the activation of nociceptors) or neuropathic (pain caused by damage to the nervous system). Nociplastic pain is functionally defined in one article as "pain arising from the altered function of pain-related sensory pathways in the periphery and CNS (Central Nervous System)," and, unlike psychogenic pain, can be diagnosed in conjunction with other types of pain.

== See also ==
- Psychogenic disease
- Psychological trauma
- Psychoneuroimmunology
- Psychosomatic medicine
- Tension myositis syndrome
