= Dysesthesia =

Unpleasant, abnormal sense of touch

- Other names: dysaesthesia
- Specialty: Neurology

Dysesthesia (dis-es-THEE-zhuh) or (dihs-ehs-THEE-zee-uh) is an unpleasant, abnormal sense of touch. Its etymology comes from the Greek word "dys," meaning "bad," and "aesthesis," which means "sensation" (abnormal sensation). It often presents as pain but may also present as an inappropriate, but not discomforting, sensation. It is caused by lesions of the nervous system, peripheral or central, and it involves sensations, whether spontaneous or evoked, such as burning, wetness, itching, electric shock, and pins and needles. Dysesthesia can include sensations in any bodily tissue, including most often the mouth, scalp, skin, or legs.

It is sometimes described as feeling like acid under the skin. Burning dysesthesia might accurately reflect an acidotic state in the synapses and perineural space. Some ion channels will open to a low pH, and the acid sensing ion channel has been shown to open at body temperature, in a model of nerve injury pain. Inappropriate, spontaneous firing in pain receptors has also been implicated as a cause of dysesthesia.

People with dysesthesia can become incapacitated with pain, despite no apparent damage to the skin or other tissue.

== Types ==
Dysesthesia can generally be described as a class of neurological disorders. It can be further classified depending on where it manifests in the body, and by the type of sensation that it provokes.

Cutaneous dysesthesia is characterized by discomfort or pain from touch to the skin by normal stimuli, including clothing. The unpleasantness can range from a mild tingling to blunt, incapacitating pain.

Scalp dysesthesia is characterized by pain or burning sensations on or under the surface of the cranial skin. Scalp dysesthesia may also present as excessive itching of the scalp.

Occlusal dysesthesia, or "phantom bite," is characterized by the feeling that the bite is "out of place" (occlusal dystopia) despite any apparent damage or instability to dental or oromaxillofacial structures or tissue. Phantom bite often presents in patients that have undergone otherwise routine dental procedures. Short of compassionate counseling, evidence for effective treatment regimes is lacking.

== Presentation ==
Chronic anxiety is often associated with dysesthesia due to extreme stress. Patients with this anxiety may experience numbness or tingling in the face. In one study, those patients that were examined psychologically had symptoms of anxiety, depression, obsessive-compulsive personality disorder, or somatic symptom disorder.

== Causes ==
- Dysesthesia is commonly seen in diabetic patients, and can be relieved by using creams containing capsaicin.
- Dysesthesia may be seen in patients with Guillain–Barré syndrome.
- Dysesthesia is among symptoms of neuropathy (along with paresthesias, gait disturbance, weakness, and absent DTRs).
- Dysesthesia, along with polyneuropathy can be a symptom of nerve damage caused by Lyme disease. The dysesthetic sensations continue after the successful antibiotic treatment of Lyme disease.
- Dysesthesia is a common symptom of a withdrawal from alcohol or other drugs.
- Dysesthesia is also a common symptom of multiple sclerosis. It is an effect of spinal cord injury.
- Many patients with occlusal dysesthesia have reported recent oral surgery before the onset of dysesthetic pain.
- Late-onset GM2 gangliosidosis may also present as burning dysesthesia.
- Chemotherapy-induced peripheral neuropathy is a progressive, enduring and often irreversible tingling numbness, intense pain, and hypersensitivity to cold, beginning in the hands and feet and sometimes involving the arms and legs caused by some chemotherapy agents.
- Dysesthesia may be caused by a thalamic stroke involving the ventral postero-lateral (VPL) nucleus. It's typically seen in Dejerine-Roussy syndrome with hemi-sensory loss and severe dysesthesia of the affected area.
- Fibromyalgia may cause dysesthesia in all areas of the body, but mostly the extremities.
- Dysesthesia is usually seen and presented in vCJD disease or also called Frank Pains due to vCJD nerve alteration.
- Dysesthesia can in some cases be caused by Benzodiazepine withdrawal syndrome or Antidepressant discontinuation syndrome.

== Diagnosis ==
=== Differential diagnosis ===
Although dysesthesia is similar to phantom limb syndrome, they should not be confused. In phantom limb, the sensation is present in an amputated or absent limb, while dysesthesia refers to discomfort or pain in a tissue that has not been removed or amputated. The dysesthetic tissue may also not be part of a limb, but part of the body, such as the abdomen. The majority of individuals with both phantom limb and dysesthesia experience painful sensations.

Phantom pain refers to dysesthetic feelings in individuals who are paralyzed or who were born without limbs. It is caused by the improper innervation of the missing limbs by the nerves that would normally innervate the limb. Dysesthesia is caused by damage to the nerves themselves, rather than by an innervation of absent tissue.

Dysesthesia should not be confused with anesthesia or hypoesthesia, which refer to a loss of sensation, or paresthesia which refers to a distorted sensation. Dysesthesia is distinct in that it can, but not necessarily, refer to spontaneous sensations in the absence of stimuli. In the case of an evoked dysesthetic sensation, such as by the touch of clothing, the sensation is characterized not simply by an exaggeration of the feeling, but rather by a completely inappropriate sensation such as burning.

== Treatment ==
Daily oral muscle physical therapy, or the administration of antidepressants have been reported as effective therapy for occlusal dysesthesia patients. Tooth grinding, and the replacement or removal of all dental work should be avoided in patients with occlusal dysesthesia, despite the frequent requests for further surgery often made by these patients.

Antidepressants are also often prescribed for scalp dysesthesia.

Prakash et al. found that many patients with burning mouth syndrome (BMS), one variant of occlusal dysesthesia, also report painful sensations in other parts of the body. Many of the patients with BMS met the classification of restless leg syndrome (RLS). About half of these patients also had a family history of RLS. These results suggest that some BMS symptoms may be caused by the same pathway as RLS in some patients, indicating that dopaminergic drugs regularly used to treat RLS may be effective in treating BMS as well.

== Research ==
There are a number of hypotheses regarding the basis of occlusal dysesthesia. Some researchers believe the disorder is a psychological one, while others believe it to be a psychosomatic disorder. Joseph Marbach hypothesized that the symptoms were rooted in psychiatric disorders. Marbach suggested that occlusal dysesthesia would occur in patients with underlying psychological problems (such as schizophrenia) after having undergone dental treatment. More recently, two studies have found that occlusal dysesthesia is associated with somatoform disorders in which the patients obsess over the oral sensations.

Similarly, Marbach later proposed that occlusal dysesthesia may be caused by the brain “talking to itself,” causing abnormal oral sensations in the absence of external stimuli. According to this model, the symptoms of dysesthesia are catalyzed by dental “amputation,” for example the extraction of a tooth, whereby the brain loses the ability to distinguish between its memory of the bite and the actual, new bite. The patient, unable to recognize his or her own bite, becomes especially attentive to these perceived oral discrepancies. Finally and most recently, Greene and Gelb suggested that instead of having a psychological root, dysesthesia may be caused by a false signal being sent from the peripheral nervous system to the central nervous system. However, the reviewers note that no method exists for determining sensor nerve thresholds, and so sensory perception in the mouth is often measured by interdental thickness discrimination (ITD), or the ability to differentiate between the sizes of objects (thin blocks) placed between teeth. In one study, occlusal dysesthesia patients showed greater ability to differentiate these thicknesses than control, healthy individuals, but these differences were not statistically significant.

=== Studies ===
- Bennett et al. produced an artificial peripheral mononeuropathy in rats by surgically constricting the sciatic nerve. These rats showed an increased response to noxious radiant heat, were nocifensive when placed on a cold metal floor, protected their hind paws, and had suppressed appetite. Additionally, the paws of many of these rats were inappropriately warm or cool to the touch, and many of the rats overgrew claws on the affected paws as well. These results indicate that the rats exhibited hyperalgesia, allodynia, and dysesthesia.
- In a study in which researchers cut spinal nerves in rats, researchers found these rats exhibited a longer duration in spontaneous foot lifting, hypersensitivity to mechanical stimuli, allodynia, and hyperalgesia. Additionally, the receptive field neurons in this nerve pathway showed spontaneous firing in low-threshold nociceptors, suggesting that nerve damage can cause dysesthesia.
- In women with chronic pain or itchy scalps without any apparent physical cause, about half had from psychiatric disorders. For the majority of these women, their symptoms of scalp dysesthesia were alleviated or removed by treatment with low doses of antidepressants.
- Landerholm et al. hypothesized that dynamic mechanical allodynia (DMA) might be the hyperbole of dynamic mechanical dysesthesia (DMD), mediated by peripheral nerves. When the researchers artificially blocked nerves in patients with peripheral neuropathic pain or central post-stroke pain, DMA symptoms in many of the patients transitioned into DMD symptoms. Additionally, the researchers determined that the number of mechanocreceptive fibers associated with the nociceptive system was responsible for the differentiation of DMA to DMD.
- Ochoa et al. recorded intraneural signals in subjects with post-ischaemic paraesthesiae. The researchers found the signals to be spontaneous. The frequency of the signals paralleled the intensity and timing of the paresthetic sensations reported by the patients. These results suggest that paresthetic sensations are the result of inappropriate firing frequency and timing by impulses from sensory cells.
- Tuskiyama et al. assessed occlusal dysesthesia patients using an interdental thickness discrimination test and a psychological examination. The researchers found that occlusal dysesthesia patients could not discriminate the thickness of material in their bite any better than normal dental patients, but that the occlusal dysesthesia patients were significantly more likely to exhibit psychological disorders.

== See also ==
- Paresthesia
- Scalp dysesthesia
- Dysaesthesia aethiopica, a pseudoscientific diagnosis
