= Marbach =

Marbach may refer to:

Places in Germany

- Marbach, Marburg, Marbach is a district of Marburg in Hesse
- Marbach stud or Weil-Marbach, a major center of horse breeding dating back several centuries, in Baden-Württemberg
- Part of Erbach (Odenwald) in Hessen
- Part of Gomadingen, Baden-Württemberg ('Marbach an der Lauter')
- Part of Lauda-Königshofen, Main-Tauber-Kreis, Baden-Württemberg
- Part of Petersberg, Hesse, district Fulda
- the town Marbach am Neckar, district Ludwigsburg, Baden-Württemberg
  - Marbach (Neckar) station
- Marbach (Lauda-Königshofen), a district of Lauda-Königshofen, Baden-Württemberg
- Marbach (Mergbach), a river of Hesse, tributary of the Mergbach

Places in Austria

- the town Marbach an der Donau in Lower Austria

Places in Switzerland

- Marbach, St. Gallen, a municipality in the canton of St. Gallen
- Marbach, Lucerne, a former municipality in the canton of Lucerne
- Escholzmatt-Marbach, a municipality in the canton of Lucerne

Places in the United States

Marbach Road in San Antonio Texas.

Marbach is home of the Marbach Cut.

People

- Johann Marbach (1521–1581), German Lutheran reformer
- Karl-Heinz Marbach (1917–1995), German Nazi officer in WWII
- Joseph J. Marbach (1935–2001), expert in the field of facial pain

Other users

- Marbach (crater) on Mars
