= Argentine Association for the Study of Pain =

Argentine medical professional organization

The Argentine Association for the Study of Pain (Spanish: Asociación Argentina para el estudio del Dolor, AAED) is the Argentine chapter of the International Association for the Study of Pain (IASP), a medical professional organization promoting research, education and policies for the knowledge and management of pain. Founded in 1974, the Argentine chapter was the first national chapter of the IASP to be created in Latin America. It organises a biannual academic conference, the Congreso Argentino de Dolor, and was scheduled to be the organiser of the IASP's worldwide conference in 2014.

Among the association's political aims has been the promotion of a "right to treatment of pain" as a human right to be recognised by the United Nations.

== See also ==
- International Association for the Study of Pain
