= Scalp dysesthesia =

- Other names: Trichodynia
- Specialty: Dermatology

Scalp dysesthesia is a cutaneous condition characterised by pain and burning sensations without objective physical examination findings. The pain sometimes is described as burning. Often there is an underlying psychosomatic cause, such as stress, depression or anxiety.

Only a few studies have been conducted on this condition. A theory behind the condition is that nerves innervating scalp hair follicles send pain messages back to the brain when the follicle no longer has a hair in it, in a similar way to phantom limb pain. Another theory is that people who have this condition (sometimes called "ponytail syndrome") have super-sensitive nerves in their scalp.

In a recent study it was hypothesised that the unpleasant sensations experienced in scalp dysesthesia are the result of a sensory neuropathy secondary to cervical spine dysfunction and chronic tension of the pericranial muscles. 16 patients were treated with a physiotherapist‐designed exercise protocol, 10 patients experienced a subjectively satisfying improvement and four had complete resolution of symptoms.

The condition is also known to be caused by meningioma.

A possible treatment is to halt hair loss in the patient, however it is important to understand and address any underlying psychologic comorbity.

Use of antidepressants in treatment has been described.

== See also ==
- Dysesthesia
- Scalp
