= Somatostatin receptor 4 =

Protein-coding gene in the species Homo sapiens

SSTR4

Identifiers
- Aliases: SSTR4, SS-4-R, SS4-R, SS4R, Somatostatin receptor 4
- External IDs: OMIM: 182454; MGI: 105372; GeneCards: SSTR4

Gene location (Human)
Chr.	Chromosome 20 (human)
Band	20p11.21	Start	23,035,312 bp
Band	20p11.21	End	23,039,237 bp

Gene location (Mouse)
Chr.	Chromosome 2 (mouse)
Band	2 G3|2 73.44 cM	Start	148,237,264 bp
Band	2 G3|2 73.44 cM	End	148,238,687 bp
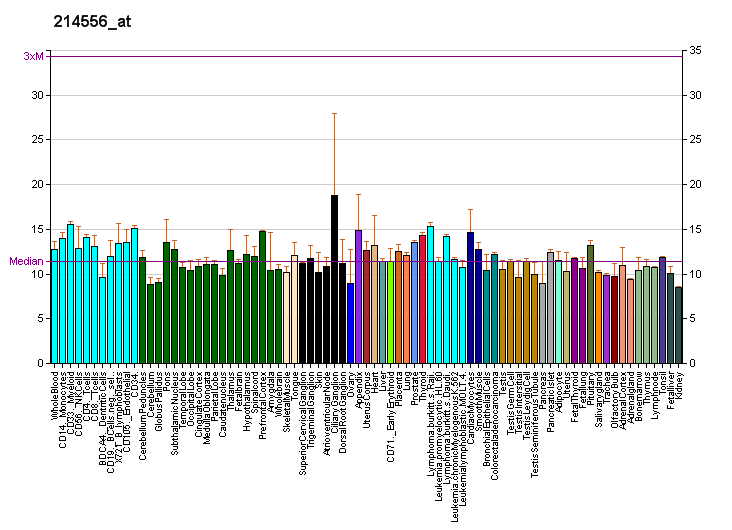
RNA expression pattern
Bgee	Human / Mouse (ortholog); Top expressed in: prefrontal cortex; cingulate gyrus; right frontal lobe; anterior cingulate cortex; cerebellar hemisphere; right hemisphere of cerebellum; Brodmann area 9; amygdala; islet of Langerhans; hippocampus proper / Top expressed in: intestinal villus; Ileal epithelium; perirhinal cortex; entorhinal cortex; primary visual cortex; dentate gyrus of hippocampal formation granule cell; CA3 field; superior frontal gyrus; granulocyte; embryo; More reference expression data
BioGPS	More reference expression data
Gene ontology
Molecular function	neuropeptide binding; G protein-coupled receptor activity; signal transducer activity; somatostatin receptor activity; peptide binding
Cellular component	cytoplasm; integral component of membrane; neuron projection; plasma membrane; integral component of plasma membrane; membrane
Biological process	G protein-coupled receptor signaling pathway; G protein-coupled receptor signaling pathway, coupled to cyclic nucleotide second messenger; forebrain development; cellular response to glucocorticoid stimulus; cell migration; arachidonic acid metabolic process; positive regulation of MAPK cascade; negative regulation of cell population proliferation; signal transduction; somatostatin signaling pathway; chemical synaptic transmission; positive regulation of ERK1 and ERK2 cascade; positive regulation of arachidonic acid secretion; negative regulation of adenylate cyclase-activating G protein-coupled receptor signaling pathway; neuropeptide signaling pathway
Sources:Amigo / QuickGO
Orthologs
Databases	NCBI: entry; OMA: entry
Species	Human	Mouse
Entrez	6754	20608
Ensembl	ENSG00000132671	ENSMUSG00000037014
UniProt	P31391	P49660
RefSeq (mRNA)	NM_001052	NM_009219
RefSeq (protein)	NP_001043	NP_033245
Location (UCSC)	Chr 20: 23.04 – 23.04 Mb	Chr 2: 148.24 – 148.24 Mb
PubMed search
- Wikidata
View/Edit Human	View/Edit Mouse

Somatostatin receptor type 4 is a protein that in humans is encoded by the SSTR4 gene.

== Function ==
Somatostatin acts at many sites to inhibit the release of many hormones and other secretory proteins. The biologic effects of somatostatin are probably mediated by a family of G protein-coupled receptors that are expressed in a tissue-specific manner. SSTR4 is a member of the superfamily of receptors having seven transmembrane segments and is expressed in highest levels in fetal and adult brain and lung.

== Ligands ==
Agonists

- J-2156
- L-803087
- Mazisotine (LY3556050)
- NNC 26-9100

== See also ==
- Somatostatin receptor
