= Pain disorder =

- Specialty: Psychiatry, neurology

Pain disorder is chronic pain experienced by a patient in one or more areas and is thought to be caused by psychological stress. The pain is often so severe that it disables the patient from proper functioning. Duration may be as short as a few days or as long as many years. The disorder may begin at any age and occurs more frequently in girls than boys. This disorder often occurs after an accident, during an illness that has caused pain, or after withdrawing from use during drug addiction, which then takes on a 'life' of its own.

== Signs and symptoms ==
Common side effects or comorbidities of pain disorder include depression, anxiety, inactivity, disability, sleep disturbance, fatigue, and disruption of social relationships. Pain conditions are generally considered "acute" if they last less than six months and "chronic" if they last six or more months. The neurological or physiological basis for chronic pain disorders is currently unknown; they are not explained by, for example, clinically obtainable evidence of disease or of damage to the painful areas.

In many cases, pain levels can vary depending on circumstances and can often be moderated to some extent by activity and mood. For example, pain symptoms may become more intense when focused on and less intense when the person is engaged in enjoyable activities. The same can be said about excessive worry. A minor physical symptom can be aggravated or become more harmful and threatening if the affected person engages in a constant body and symptom appraisal, which can lead to stress and maladaptive behavior when coping with the physical symptom.

== Cause ==
There are several theories regarding the causes of pain disorder.

- Psychodynamic theory: unconscious conflicts or desires are converted into somatic symptoms to protect the person from conscious awareness of it.
- Emotions and communication: Children show distress in what may be the only way they can, as well as physical symptoms when they lack the ability to speak or express their thoughts.
- Social influences: where psychological disorders are frowned upon, whether in families or cultures, distress may be expressed in physical terms.
- Learning theory: children learn to imitate a family member or pick up on possible gains of being "sick".
- Family systems theory: a child's role in a family may be the sick one as part of the family dynamics. Reasons why fall under four possibilities: enmeshment, overprotection, rigidity or lack of conflict resolution.
- Trauma and abuse: this includes physical, psychological, or both combined with somatization. It is a common combination. People who have a history of physical or sexual abuse are more likely to have this disorder. However, not every person with pain disorder has a history of abuse. Early intervention when pain first occurs or begins to become chronic offers the best opportunity for the prevention of pain disorder.

== Diagnosis ==
The DSM-IV-TR specifies three coded subdiagnoses: pain disorder associated with psychological factors, pain disorder associated with both psychological factors and a general medical condition and pain disorder associated with a general medical condition (although the latter subtype is not considered a mental disorder and is coded separately within the DSM-IV-TR). Conditions such as dyspareunia, somatization disorder, conversion disorder, or mood disorders can eliminate pain disorder as a diagnosis. Diagnosis depends on the ability of physicians to explain the symptoms and on psychological influences.

There are, however, authors who propose that the diagnosis for unexplained pain should be adjustment disorder because it does not pathologize individuals with this medical condition. This is proposed to avoid the stigma of such illness classification.

== Treatment ==
The prognosis is worse when there are more areas of pain reported. Treatment may include psychotherapy (with cognitive-behavioral therapy or operant conditioning), medication (often with antidepressants but also with pain medications), and sleep therapy.

According to a study performed at the Miller School of Medicine at the University of Miami, antidepressants have an analgesic effect on patients with pain disorder. In a randomized, placebo-controlled antidepressant treatment study, researchers found that "antidepressants decreased pain intensity in patients with psychogenic pain or somatoform pain disorder significantly more than placebo". Prescription and nonprescription pain medications do not help and can actually hurt if the patient experiences side effects or develops an addiction. Instead, antidepressants and talk therapy are recommended. CBT helps patients learn what worsens the pain, how to cope, and how to function in their life while handling the pain. Antidepressants work against the pain and worry. Unfortunately, many people do not believe the pain "is all in their head," so they refuse such treatments. Other techniques used in the management of chronic pain may also be of use; these include massage, transcutaneous electrical nerve stimulation, trigger point injections, surgical ablation, and non-interventional therapies such as meditation, yoga, and music and art therapy.

There are also interventions known as pain control programs that involve the removal of patients from their usual settings to a clinic or facility that provides inpatient or outpatient treatments. These include multidisciplinary or multimodal approaches, which use combinations of cognitive, behavior, and group therapies.

Before treating a patient, a psychologist must learn as many facts as possible about the patient and the situation. A history of physical symptoms and a psychosocial history help narrow down possible correlations and causes. Psychosocial history covers the family history of disorders and worries about illnesses, chronically ill parents, stress and negative life events, problems with family functioning, and school difficulties (academic and social). These indicators may reveal whether there is a connection between stress-inducing events and an onset or increase in pain, and the removal in one leading to the removal in the other. They also may show if the patient gains something from being ill and how their reported pain matches medical records. Physicians may refer a patient to a psychologist after conducting medical evaluations, learning about any psychosocial problems in the family, discussing possible connections of pain with stress, and assuring the patient that the treatment will be a combination between medical and psychological care. Psychologists must then do their best to find a way to measure the pain, perhaps by asking the patient to put it on a number scale. Pain questionnaires, screening instruments, interviews, and inventories may be conducted to discover the possibility of somatoform disorders. Projective tests may also be used.

== Epidemiology ==
Ethnicities show differences in how they express their discomfort and on how acceptable shows of pain and its tolerance are. Most obvious in adolescence, females tend to have this disorder more than males, and females reach out more. More unexplainable pains occur as people get older. Typically, younger children complain of only one symptom, commonly abdominal pains or headaches. The older they get, the more varied the pain location as well as more locations and increasing frequency.

== See also ==
- Chronic pain
- Psychogenic pain
- Psychological pain
- Somatoform disorder
