= NNC 26-9100 =

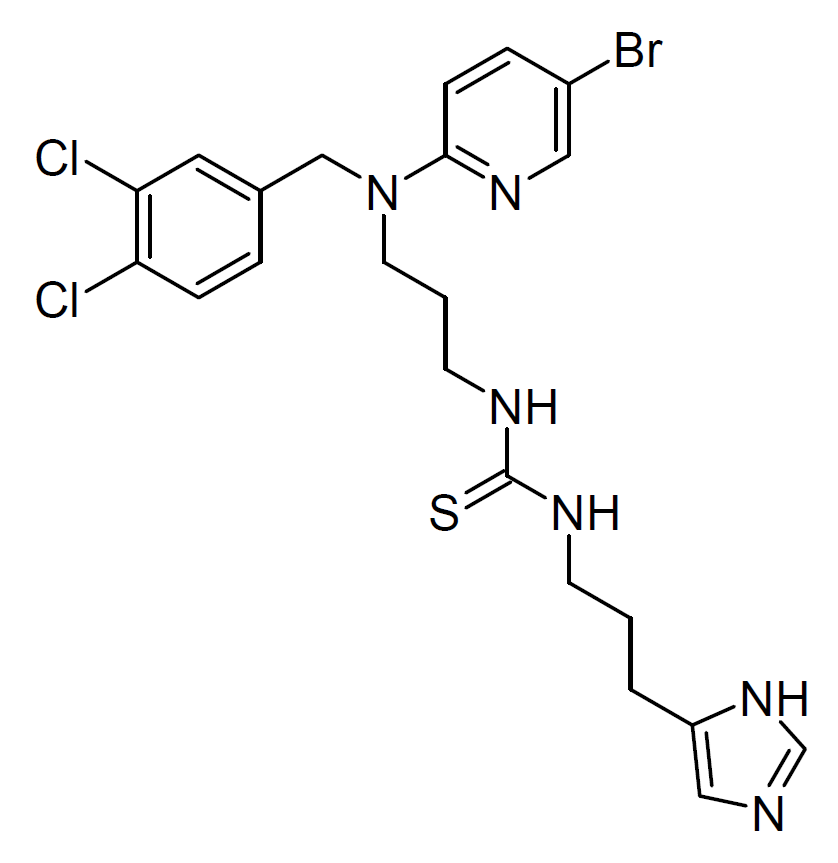

Identifiers
- IUPAC name: 1-[3-[(5-bromo-2-pyridinyl)-[(3,4-dichlorophenyl)methyl]amino]propyl]-3-[3-(1H-imidazol-5-yl)propyl]thiourea
- CAS Number: 199522-35-5
- PubChem CID: 9893924
- UNII: 9X9D329ZX2

Chemical and physical data
- Formula: C_{22}H_{25}BrCl_{2}N_{6}S
- Molar mass: 556.35 g·mol^{−1}
- 3D model (JSmol): Interactive image
- SMILES: C1=CC(=C(C=C1CN(CCCNC(=S)NCCCC2=CN=CN2)C3=NC=C(C=C3)Br)Cl)Cl
- InChI: InChI=1S/C22H25BrCl2N6S/c23-17-5-7-21(29-12-17)31(14-16-4-6-19(24)20(25)11-16)10-2-9-28-22(32)27-8-1-3-18-13-26-15-30-18/h4-7,11-13,15H,1-3,8-10,14H2,(H,26,30)(H2,27,28,32); Key:UREJDUPKGMFJRU-UHFFFAOYSA-N

NNC 26-9100 is a chemical compound which acts as an agonist at somatostatin receptor 4. It has been researched for potential applications in the treatment of Alzheimer's disease, and has positive effects on learning and memory in animal studies.

== See also ==
- J-2156
- Mazisotine
