= J-2156 =

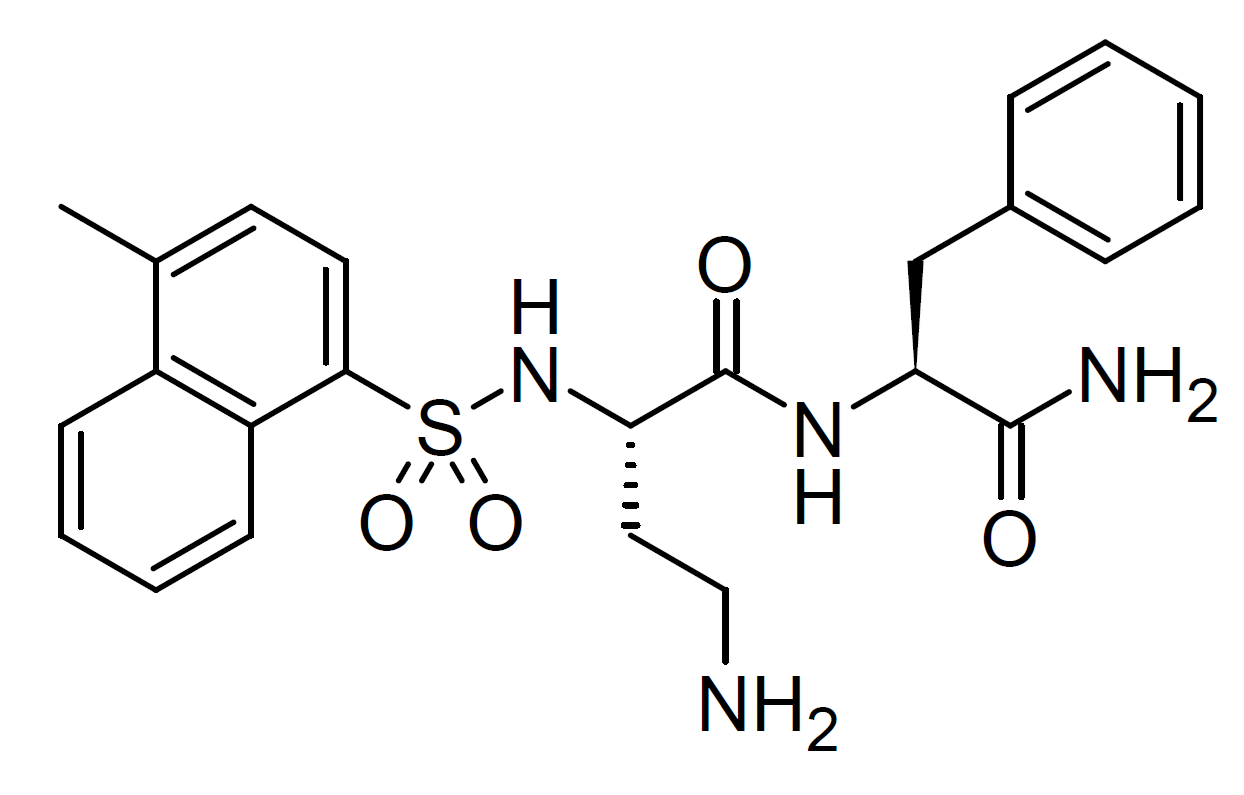

Identifiers
- IUPAC name: (2S)-4-amino-N-[(2S)-1-amino-1-oxo-3-phenylpropan-2-yl]-2-[(4-methylnaphthalen-1-yl)sulfonylamino]butanamide
- CAS Number: 848647-56-3
- PubChem CID: 11442741
- IUPHAR/BPS: 10115
- ChemSpider: 9617604
- UNII: H35JAI9M2X
- ChEMBL: ChEMBL4451852
- PDB ligand: I8B (PDBe, RCSB PDB)

Chemical and physical data
- Formula: C_{24}H_{28}N_{4}O_{4}S
- Molar mass: 468.57 g·mol^{−1}
- 3D model (JSmol): Interactive image
- SMILES: CC1=CC=C(C2=CC=CC=C12)S(=O)(=O)N[C@@H](CCN)C(=O)N[C@@H](CC3=CC=CC=C3)C(=O)N
- InChI: InChI=1S/C24H28N4O4S/c1-16-11-12-22(19-10-6-5-9-18(16)19)33(31,32)28-20(13-14-25)24(30)27-21(23(26)29)15-17-7-3-2-4-8-17/h2-12,20-21,28H,13-15,25H2,1H3,(H2,26,29)(H,27,30)/t20-,21-/m0/s1; Key:VTNCZBXJSGKDLS-SFTDATJTSA-N

J-2156 is a chemical compound which was one of the first compounds developed that acts as an agonist at somatostatin receptor 4. It has analgesic and anti-hyperalgesic effects and is widely used in research into the role of SST4 receptors in pain perception and other neurological functions.

== See also ==
- Mazisotine
- NNC 26-9100
