= Wide dynamic range neuron =

Gate Control Theory Firing of the inhibitory interneuron (responding to the non-painful stimuli) decreases the probability that the projection neuron (responsible for pain responses) will fire an action potential

The wide dynamic range (WDR) neuron was first discovered by Mendell in 1966. Early studies of this neuron established what is known as the gate control theory of pain. The basic concept is that non-painful stimuli block the pathways for painful stimuli, inhibiting possible painful responses. This theory was supported by the fact that WDR neurons are responsible for responses to both painful and non-painful stimuli, and the idea that these neurons could not produce more than one of these responses simultaneously. WDR neurons respond to all types of somatosensory stimuli, make up the majority of the neurons found in the posterior grey column, and have the ability to produce long range responses including those responsible for pain and itch.

== Anatomy and physiology ==
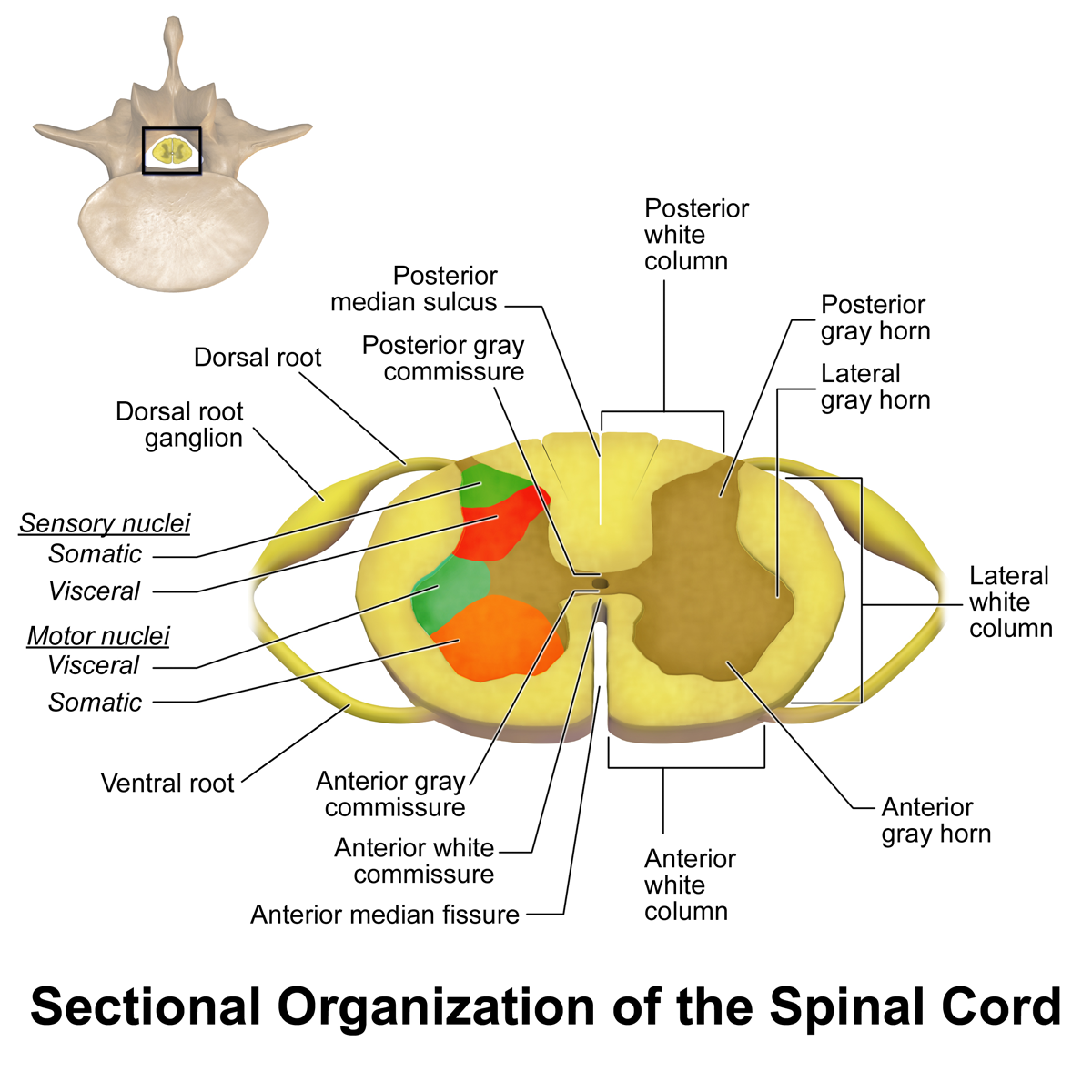
Spinal Cord Sectional Anatomy

WDR neurons are found in the posterior grey column of the spinal cord. This area of the spinal cord houses two different types of neurons involved in the process of pain: WDR neurons and nociceptive specific neurons (NS). As the name implies, NS neurons give specific short range responses. WDR neurons are able to give long range responses for a large variety of stimuli giving them the ability to help identify the location and intensity of painful stimulation (sensory discrimination).

WDR neurons differ from most other neurons in that they are theorised to experience what is called a ‘wind up’. This allows for the intensity of their response to increase with an increased frequency of stimulus. Most other neurons fire repeated action potentials of the same magnitude as a reaction to an increase in stimulus intensity. The intensity of the stimulus will only boost the frequency of action potentials, not their magnitude. However, WDR neurons exhibit increased action potential intensity with more presentations of a stimulus. This allows for plasticity of synapses and creates flexibility in the neuronal response. Though this may be of some benefit to the organism, this over excitation of the neurons can result in chronic pain.

== Role in pain responses ==
When there is a painful stimulus there are two pathways that can be taken. The nociceptive neurons in Rexed lamina 1 become compromised or the WDR neurons become compromised. The WDR neurons can respond to electrical, mechanical, and thermal stimulation. The dorsal cord has faulty plasticity, which encourages the development of neuropathic pain after an injury to a nerve. This allows for the over-excitation discussed previously, resulting in chronic pain. The unique pain pathway of the WDR neurons allows information about the stimulus to be used to map out the intensity of the pain through sensory discrimination.

There are two main types of pain that we experience in our bodies: pain caused by damage of body tissue and pain caused by nerve damage. Nociceptive pain serves as a warning or signal for tissue damage and works to preserve the body’s equilibrium and functionality. This pain is signaled by the interworkings of both the peripheral and central nervous systems. Another type of pain, known as neuropathic pain, is caused by a direct problem or disease that affects the nerves in the central nervous system.

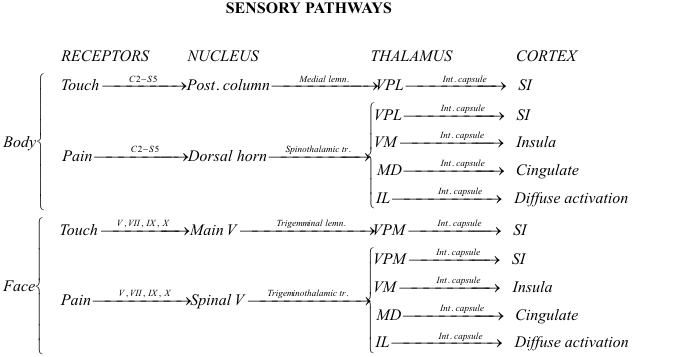
The sensory pathways the WDR neurons can play a role in.

A subset of this neuropathic pain, known as chronic neuropathic pain, is characterized by its long lasting and high pain intensity. Although there is still a lot unknown about the direct cause of this chronic pain, it has been linked to WDR neurons. These neurons show significant activation by sympathetic stimulation while neurons, such as NS neurons, do not show the same level of activation. The blocking of sympathetic pathways seemed to decrease pain and once unblocked, symptoms of pain persisted. This indicates that one of the many complex mechanisms contributing to this neuropathic chronic pain is the overstimulation of the WDR neurons by sympathetic stimulation.

Another aspect that plays a role in neuropathic pain is the transient receptor channel called TRPA1. This channel is known to have influenced chronic pain injuries and diseases such as inflammation, diabetes, fibromyalgia, bronchitis, and emphysema. WDR neurons are a huge part of the somatosensory system, helping to send and receive signals based on sensory changes in the body. The TRPA1 channel has been closely associated with temperature and pain sensation in primary afferent sensory neurons and are largely found in nociceptive sensory neurons in the dorsal root ganglia. The inhibition of TRPA1 is known to contribute to different inflammatory and neuropathic diseases by amplifying the pain and hypersensitivity. This is an area of study that is beneficial to continue to study and learn how to target and control aspects of chronic inflammatory and neuropathic diseases involved in sensory responses that WDR neurons play a role in.

== Role in itch responses ==
Additionally, the itch pathway has also been linked with WDR neurons because itch and pain pathways are closely associated. As there are transient receptor channels present in the pain pathway, they are also present in the itch pathway. In the itch pathway, when the transient receptor channels are activated an itch response can be elicited. Itch responses can also be controlled by temperature changes (too high or too low), much like pain. This mechanism of control occurs when a stimulus is at an extremely low or extremely high temperature. The organism's sensitivity to the stimulus increases, meaning the pain or itch elicited will be greater at those temperatures than they would be at room temperature. Though these pathways display many similarities, there are other mechanisms by which itch sensations can be controlled, such as those through nerve growth factor and substance-P.

Brain imaging indicates similar activity in many areas of the brain such as prefrontal, supplementary motor areas, premotor cortex, anterior insular cortex, and many others when itch and pain regions are activated. A better understanding of both these pathways will provide a greater understanding of WDR neurons.
