= Quantitative sensory testing =

Tests for somatosensory function

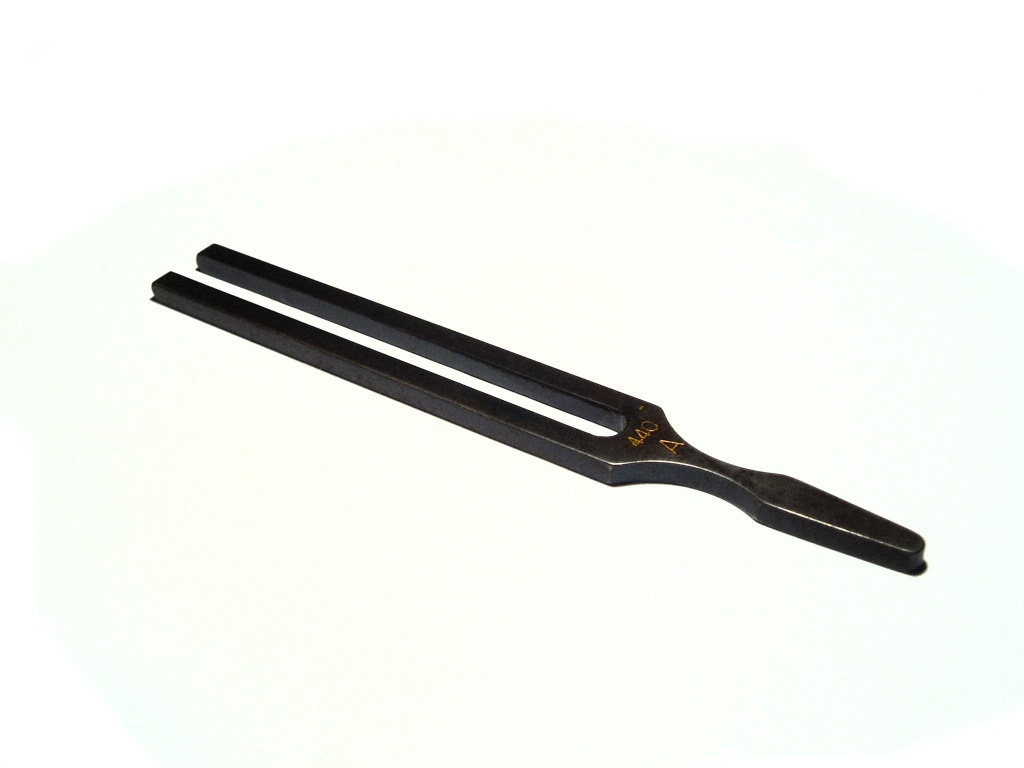
- Tuning forks are used to determine vibration detection thresholds.
- Specialty: Neurology

Quantitative sensory testing (QST) is a panel of diagnostic tests used to assess somatosensory function, in the context of research and as a supplemental tool in the diagnosis of somatosensory disorders, including pain insensitivity, painless and painful neuropathy. The panel of tests examine a broad range of different sensations, including hot, cold, touch, vibration. It has both positive and negative tests (can test for increased or reduced sensitivity). QST reflects a formalisation of existing neurological tests into a standardised battery designed to detect subtle changes in sensory function. Large datasets representing normal responses to sensory tests have been established to quantitate deviation from the mean and allow comparison with normal patients. It is thought that a detailed evaluation of somatosensory function may be useful in identifying subtypes of pain and as a potential tool to identify asymptomatic neuropathy, which may represent up to 50% of total people with neuropathy (or loss of the nerve fibres). In clinical use, it is often combined with other tests such as clinical electrophysiology. In research settings it is increasingly applied in combination with advanced imaging such as fMRI, epidermis "nerve" biopsies and microneurography to classify subtypes of painful disorders.

== Clinical recommendations ==
The Neuropathic Pain Special Interest Group (NeuPSIG) of the International Association for the Study of Pain (IASP) have recommended the clinical use of QST in the diagnosis and evaluation of patients with small and large fibre neuropathy as well as screening for deficits of the somatosensory system (which may include deficits in the brain for instance). The group also recommend that the technique not be used in patients in litigation, or with severe learning or cognitive deficits as it is likely to be inaccurate due to its psychophysical basis. The recommendations are based on large trials suggesting inter-test reliability of the method.

== Testing battery ==
Standard parameters are evaluated using calibrated testing apparatus. The tests can be performed in multiple areas of the body; the areas are limited by the existing available normal sensory data. All of the tests are repeated several times. A widely used set of parameters was proposed by the German Research Network on Neuropathic Pain. Subject values are compared to normal data to determine whether the subject has a deficit in any modality.

Test	Abbreviation	Brief Description	Purpose
Mechanical Detection Threshold	MDT	Graded Von Frey filaments - that deliver increasing stimulus intensity are applied to the subject, the first stimulus to be perceived is recorded.	Identify dysfunction in Aβ fibres
Vibration Detection Threshold	VDT	A tuning fork is placed on a bony prominence such as the elbow or knee, the subject reports when they can no longer detect vibration.	Identify dysfunction in Aβ fibres
Cold Detection Threshold	CDT	A peltier device applies an increasingly cold stimulus, the subject reports when they can feel cold.	Identify dysfunction of Aδ fibres
Paradoxical Heat Sensations	PHS	Alternating stimuli of hot and cold are applied, the subject is asked if they feel heat when a cold stimulus is applied during this procedure.	Either the dysfunction of Aδ fibres or the disruption of central cold processing.
Warm Detection Threshold	WDT	A peltier device is used to warm and area of the body, the subject reports when they feel warmth.	Detect changes warm detection. C fibres are thought to contribute but the relative contributions are disputed.
Wind-up Ratio	WUR	The subject is asked to compare the perceived stimulus intensity of a single pin prick to ten consecutive pin pricks.	Detect abnormal amplification of pain stimuli.
Mechanical Pain Threshold	MPT	A custom pin stimulator is used, it delivers pins at increasing force, the subject is asked to report the first detection of sharpness.	Identify dysfunction of Aδ fibres, and C-fibers
Mechanical Pain Sensitivity	MPS	The same stimulator is used, a force ~8X higher than the threshold is used and the subject is asked to rate their pain on a 100-point scale.	Identify dysfunction of Aδ fibres, and C-fibers
Cold Pain Threshold	CPT	A peltier device applies an increasingly cold stimulus, the subject is asked to report when they feel pain.	Identify dysfunction of Aδ fibres
Heat Pain Threshold	HPT	A peltier device applies an increasingly hot stimulus, the subject is asked to report when they feel pain.	Identify dysfunction of C fibres
Pressure Pain Threshold	PPT	A pressure application device is used to apply graded pressure, the subject is asked to report the point at which they feel pain.	Identify dysfunction of Aδ fibres, and C-fibers
Dynamic Mechanical Allodynia	ALL/DMA	Pain score is reported for a moving innocuous mechanical stimuli, such as a cotton tip.	Identify presence of allodynia

== Rationale ==
In addition to diagnostic confidence with neuropathy, additional reasons may encourage the use of QST.

=== Classification of neuropathic pain ===
It is thought that patients with neuropathic pain can be grouped into clusters based on their sensory profiles and that this may have a role in determining treatment. After-the fact (or Post Hoc) analysis of the responders to treatments in clinical trials have suggested different clinical responses may cluster based on phenotype and preliminary clinical trials suggest some analgesics show a greater efficacy in patient subtypes. The European medicines agency allow the classification of patients by QST in clinical trials. It is proposed that in cases where efficacy is only shown in one identified QST group, the drug will only be approved for use with those patients. Additionally, in Europe, QST is now allowed as a secondary outcome in clinical trials.

=== Early disease identification ===
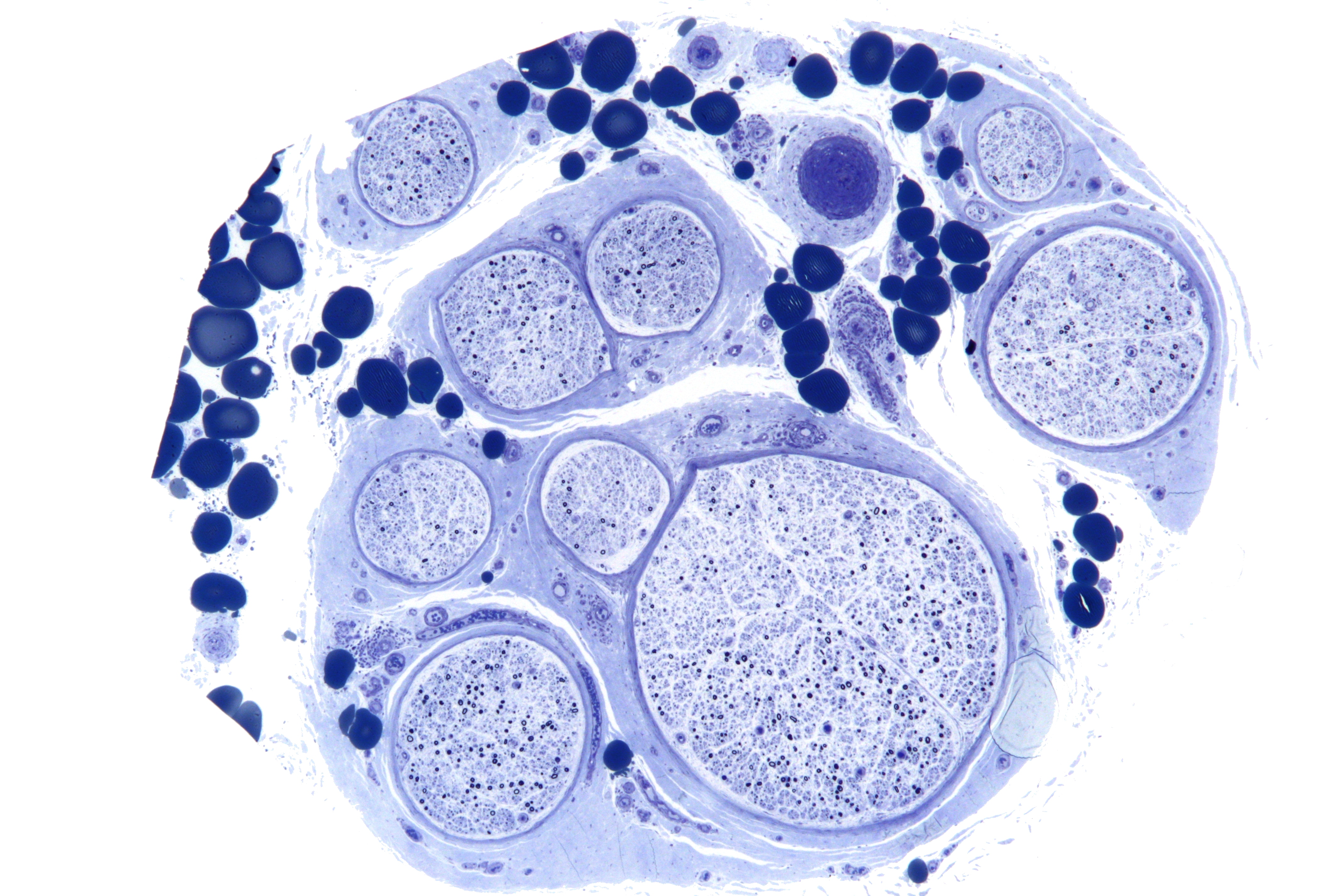
Progressive neuropathy can lead to irreversible damage, early identification of asymptomatic neuropathy may prevent loss of limb.

The early identification of neuropathy particularly in diabetic neuropathy may be useful to identify people with asymptomatic neuropathy. Asymptomatic neuropathy is a clinical concern because patients with untreated neuropathy may develop ulcers and damage due to a loss of protective sensation.

== Weaknesses ==
QST relies on psychophysical report of responses to stimuli. As a result, it may be subject to patient biases. Nerve conduction studies may provide a more reliable metric in certain clinical situations. However, nerve conduction studies poorly identify hypersensitivity, QST can identify both loss and gain of function. Psychophysical tests are generally affected by other difficult to control factors, such as stress, the experience of the tester, the room the test is in, the novelty of the environment and the person's temperament. The test is time-consuming and may take an hour to perform, and for monitoring require multiple visits.

== See also ==
- Peripheral neuropathy
- Neuropathic pain
- Laser-evoked potential
- Somatosensory system
