= Joseph J. Marbach =

American medical researcher (1935–2001)

Dr. Joseph J Marbach DDS (April 4, 1935 – July 22, 2001) was a leader in the field of facial pain. He was a chaired professor at University of Medicine and Dentistry of New Jersey. Marbach was born in Paterson, New Jersey to immigrant parents. He was educated at Drew University, Madison, New Jersey and University of Pennsylvania where he received his degree in dentistry.

From 1960 to 1963, he was a captain in the US Air Force based in Aviano, Italy. He returned to NYC in 1963 and joined the practice of Lazlo Schwartz, DDS and began working in the dental clinic at Columbia University. He assisted Laszlo Schwartz in clinical tasks and research, and as the result of Schwartz's illness taught the course in TMJ disorders to the third-year dental students during the 1964/65 academic year.

From 1966 to 1971 he worked as an assistant clinical professor at Mount Sinai School of Medicine. Marbach established a TMJ facial pain clinic at Mount Sinai Hospital. He taught theory and practice of pain disorders to general dental and oral surgery residents. He attended Mount Sinai Hospital Arthritis Clinic and conducted combined research with the director Dr Harry Spiera. Between 1969 and 1983 Marbach directed the TMJ facial pain clinic at Columbia University School of Dental and Oral Surgery. The clinic was changed during that time from a solely patient care clinic to encompass a center for clinical research. From 1969 to 1976 he held an adjunct professorship at Columbia University and from 1976 to 1984 he was the clinical professor of dentistry there. He taught third year and doctorate students of dentistry.

From 1983 to 1997 Marbach worked at Columbia University School of Public Health (Division of Sociomedical Sciences) as a clinical professor of public health. There he developed teaching programs in chronic pain for graduate students in the social sciences. From 1983 to 1996 he was the director of the Pain Research Unit Columbia University School of Public Health (Division of Sociomedical Sciences) He was responsible for developing research programs applying the social sciences to problems in chronic pain. He linked sociology, anthropology and psychology methods to help address issues in the diagnosis and treatment of various painful disorders affecting various organ systems.

From 1985 to 1987 he became a lecturer on social medicine and health policy at Harvard University School of Medicine. He initiated research projects related to social issues that affected the diagnosis and treatment of chronic pain. From 1985 to 1987 Marbach was a visiting professor and director of the Harvard University Oral and Facial Pain Clinic at Harvard University School of Dental Medicine. The clinic is primarily designed to serve as a research facility while at the same time offering diagnosis and care for unusual chronic pain disorders.

From 1993 to 1997 he held a joint appointment as clinical professor of public health in the Department of Psychiatry, College of Physicians & Surgeons, Columbia University.

From 1998 to 2001 Marbach held a joint appointment as lecturer at the School of Public Health Division of Sociomedical Sciences and Department of Psychiatry, College of Physicians & Surgeons, Columbia University.

From 1996 to 2001 he was the first Robert & Susan Carmel Professor in Algesiology, University of Medicine and Dentistry of New Jersey, Department of Oral Pathology, Biology & Diagnostic Science Department of Psychiatry.
