= Electromyoneurography =

- Synonyms: Electroneuromyography
- Purpose: measurement of a peripheral nerve’s conduction velocity

Electromyoneurography (EMNG) is the combined use of electromyography and electroneurography This technique allows for the measurement of a peripheral nerve's conduction velocity upon stimulation (electroneurography) alongside electrical recording of muscular activity (electromyography). Their combined use proves to be clinically relevant by allowing for both the source and location of a particular neuromuscular disease to be known, and for more accurate diagnoses.

== Characteristics ==
Electromyoneurography is a technique that uses surface electrical probes to obtain electrophysiological readings from nerve and muscle cells. The nerve activity is generally recorded using surface electrodes, stimulating the nerve at one site and recording from another with a minimum distance between the two. The time difference of the potential is a measure of the time taken for the potential to travel the distance across the two sites and is a measure of the conduction velocity along the nerve. The amplitude of the potential, measured baseline to peak, or peak to peak, is a measure of the number of fibers conducting the response. Abnormality in data obtained from nerve measurements, such as absent or low amplitude, indicates potential nerve damage.

This technique is used in many medical fields today. One example of its use is to detect neuropathy due to diseases like diabetes mellitus. It can also be used to detect muscle weakness or paralysis due to sepsis or multi-organ failure in comatose patients. This method remains a largely used medical technique due to its efficiency and relative simplicity. It is especially attractive due to the lack of special precautions or preparation involved with this procedure. There is minimal pain and no significant risks except those associated with needle use.

== History ==
The technique of electromyoneurography was first practiced in the late 1970s by the American Academy of General Practice. The use of this technique enhances diagnostic capability by defining and localizing the target site. In 1978, Milton B. Spiegel, research physician with The Rehabilitation Institute of South Florida, wrote one of the first major academic papers surrounding the uses and benefits of electromyoneurography. It was in this paper that Dr. Spiegel suggested that pre-examination of the patients' range of motion and reflexes would eliminate time and exploration of nerve entrapments during the electromyoneurographic procedure.

In the early 1980s, the practice of utilizing electromyoneurography became more widely accepted in the medical community, specifically aiding in the diagnoses of neuropathy, radiculopathy, and axonopathy. As to more recent use, electromyoneurography has been employed throughout the 21st century, aiding in the diagnosis of carpal tunnel syndrome, abnormal glucose levels, and many other myopathies. This procedure now analyzes the nerve conduction and muscle potentials through the use of H-Reflex and F-Wave studies. Combined with a pre-examination, electromyoneurography is utilized to detect neuromuscular abnormalities.

== Modern Application ==
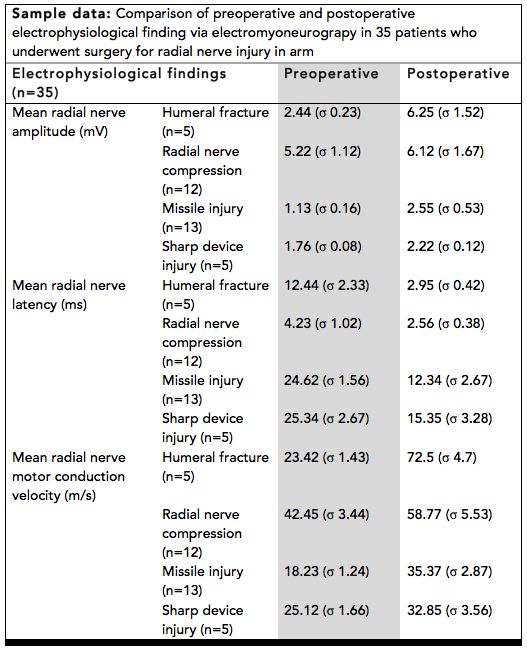
This is sample data table showing what data obtained from electromyoneurography looks like. Findings are measured in the form of amplitude (mV), latency (ms), and velocity (m/s) of the injured radial nerve, before and after surgery.

Electromyoneurography has a variety of modern applications. The high level of sensitivity that electromyoneurography employs makes it ideal for detecting peripheral nerve damage as well as a variety of myopathies in their early stages. This electrophysiological data obtaining technique has been able to heighten diagnostic capabilities when looking at peripheral neuropathy disorders like radiculopathy, and axonopathy in addition to myopathies such as muscular dystrophy, myotonia, and myasthenia gravis. Electromyoneurography was the main technique used in a study to detect diabetic polyneuropathy, a serious condition that is progressive in nature.

Electromyoneurography can also be used to measure patient recovery from surgical procedures, such as nerve repair. A study conducted on patients with proximal radial nerve injuries used the procedure to indicate the degree of both pre- and postoperative nerve damage. In this particular study, electromyoneurography was the preferred method of measuring recovery, chosen over magnetic resonance imaging (MRI) and computed tomography (CT) scans. When looking at the sample data table, one can see that postoperative patients generally see an increase in mean radial nerve amplitude, a decrease in mean radial nerve latency and increases in nerve motor conduction velocity. These results are all general trends that would be expected when operating on damaged nerves in effort to increase their performance.

Electromyoneurography's unique combination of recording in muscle and nerve simultaneously typically results in a higher level of diagnostic ability in the field of medicine. This heightened utility often results in a lesser demand for more invase techniques for acquiring electrophysiological data, such as myelography, a procedure where complications are not uncommon and the amount of attention required for post-operative care is more involved.

== Conditions Diagnosed with Electromyoneurography ==
Electromyoneurography has been found to be particularly useful in diagnosing the following neuromuscular conditions, though it is not an exhaustive list:

I. Myopathy (disease or disturbance of striated muscle fibers or cell membrane)	II. Neuropathy (disease or disorder of the lower motor neuron)
Primary (muscle fiber): muscular dystrophy Duchenne muscular dystrophy Facioscapulohumeral muscular dystrophy Limb-girdle muscular dystrophy	Myelopathy (lesion involving motor neuron in anterior horn of the spinal cord) Spinal muscular atrophy Progressive muscular atrophy Poliomyelitis Amyotrophic lateral sclerosis Charcot–Marie–Tooth disease
Cell membrane hyper-irritability (attributed to spindle cell hyperactivity) Myotonic dystrophy Myotonia congenita Paramyotonia congenita	Radiculopathy (lesion involving the nerve root) Spinal disc herniation Spinal stenosis Guillain–Barré syndrome
Myasthenia Myasthenia gravis Lambert–Eaton myasthenic syndrome Hypokalemia Glycogen storage disease type V Cushing's syndrome	Axonopathy (disease or damage to the axon or peripheral nerve) Carpal tunnel syndrome Radial neuropathy Meralgia paraesthetica Hypothyroidism

== Procedure Outline ==
In an electromyoneurography procedure, recording of the muscle is done by insertion of a needle. The recordings are taken when the muscle is at rest and when the muscle is contracting; the muscle will contract based on the directions of the one performing the test (instructing the patient to move certain body parts in certain directions forming muscle contractions). Various regions of muscle on the body are examined in an electromyoneurography test and the procedure lasts anywhere between 30 and 60 minutes (2–5 minutes per muscle). In addition to examining the muscles, the conduction velocity of nerve signals are measured. The nerve's ability to transmit signals is tested by inserting recording electrodes to capture the data and signal electrodes to initiate signals down a nerve by applying a small shock. Self-generated potentials also occur naturally for recording, in addition to the artificial "shock". Evaluating a nerve's conduction velocity, together with testing potentials, allows for a beneficial diagnosis that can detect pain and sensory problems at the neuromuscular level.

== Expected Test Results ==
Action potential propagation animation

The needle is normally attached to a recording device known as an electromyography machine. The results show the appearance of action potential or graded potential spikes. While interpretation of the results requires background knowledge, irregular data can be used to diagnose many diseases. If the activity of the nerves at rest is abnormal, this may indicate nerve lesion, radiculopathy, or lower motor nerve degeneration. The amplitude or duration of the potential spike may also be used to gather information. A decreased amplitude or duration may indicate nerve damage due to a muscle diseases, whereas an increase in these demonstrates reinervation, or repair by new nerve connections to the muscles, has occurred.
