= International Association for the Study of Pain =

International learned society

- Abbreviation: IASP
- Formation: 1973
- Type: Nongovernmental organization
- Purpose: Scientific research and clinical translation
- Headquarters: Washington, D.C., United States
- Coordinates: 38°54′0.1″N 77°02′3.4″W
- Region served: Worldwide
- Official language: English
- President: Claudia Sommer
- Website: www.iasp-pain.org

The International Association for the Study of Pain (IASP) is an international learned society promoting research, education, and policies for the understanding, prevention, and treatment of pain. IASP was founded in 1973 under the leadership of John J. Bonica. Its secretariat, formerly based in Seattle, Washington, is now located in Washington, D.C. It publishes the scientific journal PAIN, PAIN Reports and PAIN: Clinical Updates. IASP currently has more than 7,200 members from 133 countries and in 94 chapters worldwide. IASP supports 20 Special Interest Groups (SIGs) which members may join to network and collaborate with others in their specific field of research or practice.

== Global Year Against Pain ==
In 2004, supported by various IASP chapters and federations holding their own local events and activities worldwide, IASP initiated its first "Global Year Against Pain" with the motto "The Relief of Pain Should be a Human Right". Every year, the focus is on another aspect of pain.

Years	Theme
2004–2005	Right to Pain Relief
2005–2006	Pain in Children
2006–2007	Pain in Older Persons
2007–2008	Pain in Women
2008–2009	Cancer Pain
2009–2010	Musculoskeletal Pain
2010–2011	Acute Pain
2011–2012	Headache
2012–2013	Visceral Pain
2013–2014	Orofacial Pain
2014–2015	Neuropathic Pain
2016	Global Year Against Pain in the Joints
2017	Global Year Against Pain After Surgery
2018	Global Year for Excellence in Pain Education
2019	Global Year Against Pain in the Most Vulnerable
2020	Global Year to the Prevention of Pain
2021	Global Year Against Back Pain
2022	Global Year for Translating Knowledge into Practice
2023	Global Year for Integrative Pain Care
2024	Global Year About Sex and Gender Disparities in Pain

== World Congress on Pain ==
The World Congress on Pain is the largest global gathering of pain professionals. This event brings together more than 7,000 scientists, clinicians, and healthcare providers from around the world and across pain disciplines. The program comprises plenary sessions, workshops, poster sessions, and refresher courses, and attendees may receive continuing medical education credits.

== Special interest groups ==
- Abdominal and pelvic pain
- Acute pain
- Cancer pain
- Clinical trials
- Complex regional pain syndrome
- Ethical and legal issues in pain
- Genetics and pain
- Itch
- Methodology, evidence synthesis, and implementation
- Musculoskeletal pain
- Neuromodulation
- Neuropathic pain

== See also ==
- Argentinian Association for the Study of Pain
