= Pathophysiology of nerve entrapment =

Physiological changes caused by nerve compression

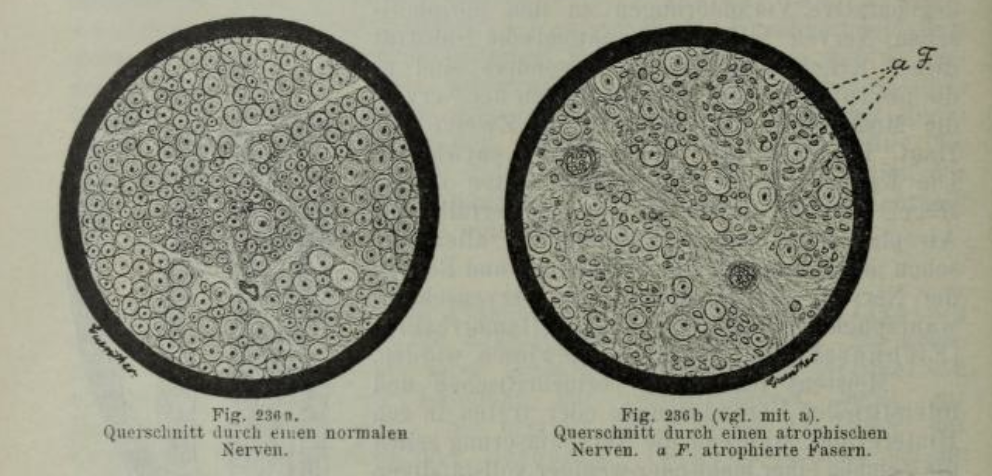
Histological comparison of a normal nerve and an atrophied nerve using a cross-slice of the sciatic nerve. Left is a normal nerve. Right is an atrophied nerve.

Nerve entrapment involves a cascade of physiological changes caused by compression and tension. Some of these changes are irreversible. The magnitude and duration of the forces determines the extent of injury. In the acute form, mechanical injury and metabolic blocks impede nerve function. In the chronic form, there is a sequence of changes starting with a breakdown of the blood-nerve-barrier, followed by edema with connective tissue changes, followed by diffuse demyelination, and finally followed by axonmetesis. The injury will often be a mixed lesion where mild/moderate compression is a combination of a metabolic block and neuropraxia, while severe compression combines elements of neuropraxia and axonmetesis.

== Peripheral nerve anatomy ==
Anatomy of a myelinated nerve cell

=== Nerve cell ===
Nerve cells comprise a small cell body and a very long segment called the axon. The cell body resides in the spinal cord and the axon extends all the way to the innervation target of the nerve. Peripheral nerve axons can be longer than 100 cm as they may need to travel along the full length of a limb to reach their innervation target, while the cell body is only 100 micrometers long. Nerves may be myelinated or unmyelinated. Myelinated nerves have the axon covered by segments of schwann cells, which are short and concentrically wrapped around the diameter of an axon to give the appearance of a sausage-like mass and called a myelin sheath. The schwann cells are arranged in pattern such all parts of the axon are wrapped in schwann cells and successive schwann cells are separated by a very small distance. This separation gap is called a node of Ranvier. Unmyelinated nerves are also surrounded by schwann cells but the schwann cells are not wrapped around the axon multiple times to form a myelin sheath.

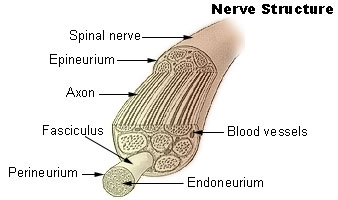
Anatomy of a nerve fiber

=== Nerve fiber ===
The axons of nerve cells are surrounded by various connective tissue layers and bundled together in a structure called a nerve fiber. At the surface of a nerve fiber is a tissue layer called the epineurium or sometimes external epineurium. Within the epineurium there is a connective tissue matrix called the internal epineurium and fascicles. The internal epineurium acts as soft cushion for the fascicles. A nerve fiber may have a variable number of fascicles, but there will be at least one (otherwise there would be no nerve cells). Fascicles are surrounded by a tissue layer called the perineurium which is a protective sheath that acts as a barrier. Inside the fascicles is the endoneurium, a tissue matrix analogous to the internal epineurium, and the nerve cells. The endoneurium has many small blood capillaries (endoneurial microvessels) which directly supply the nerves themselves. These capillaries have tight junctions to prevent the free flow of materials between cells and instead require substances to pass through the endothelial cells.

=== Blood nerve barrier ===
The peripheral blood nerve barrier is analogous to the blood brain barrier. Like the blood brain barrier, the blood nerve barrier creates a stable, privileged environment where certain substances cannot pass through due to tight junctions. The blood nerve barrier is made up of inner cells of the perineurium and the endothelial cells of the endoneurial microvessels.

== Physical forces which cause entrapment ==
Nerve entrapment is caused primarily by two physical forces on soft tissue: compression and tension. Compression will squeeze the nerve and impair its local microcirculatory environment which commonly happens in anatomic tunnels. Tension is a pulling force, often caused by scarring which impedes nerve mobility during limb movements. Both the magnitude and duration of these forces can determine the extent of injury.

=== Compression ===
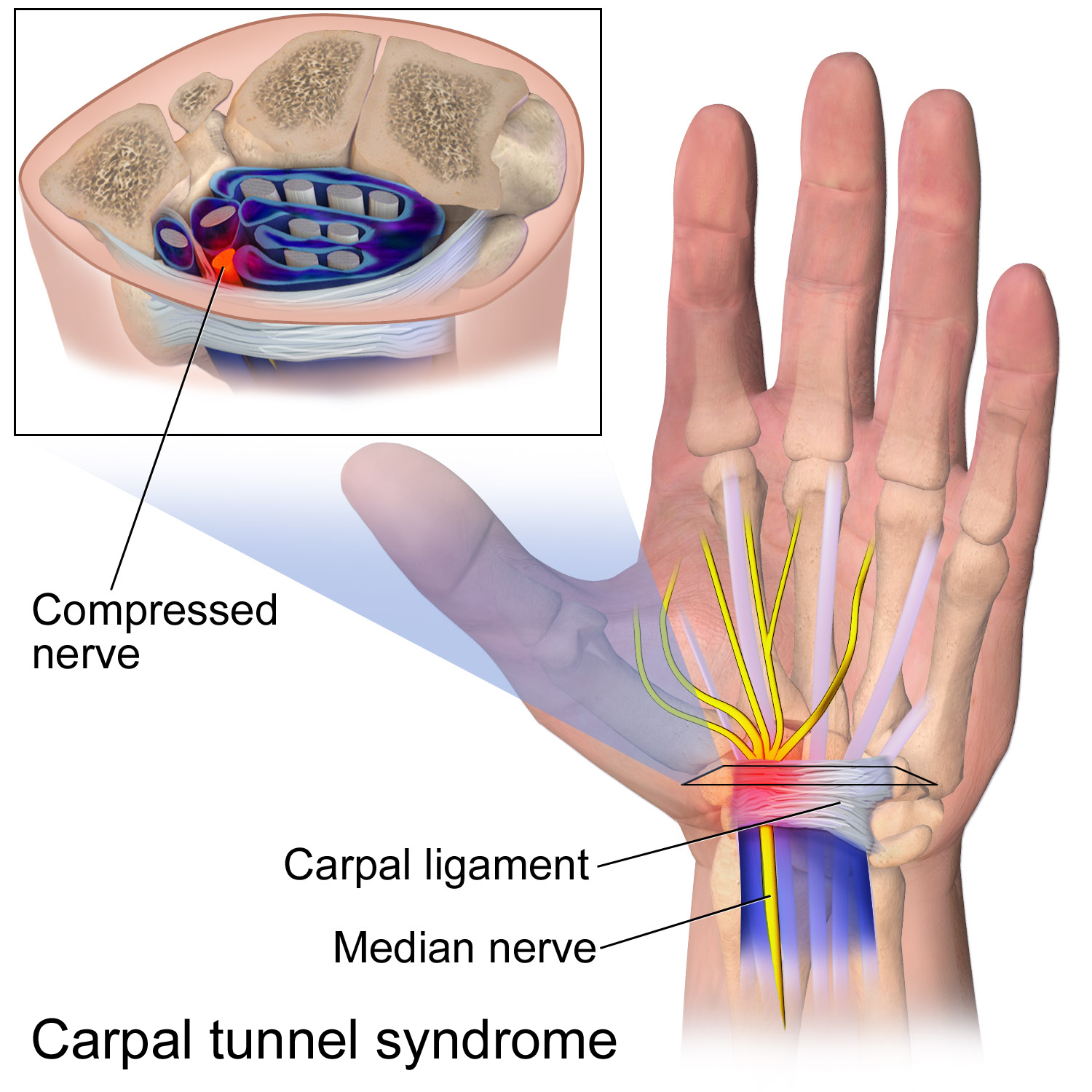
Carpal tunnel syndrome is caused by compression of the median nerve at the carpal tunnel. The carpal tunnel is formed by the bones of the wrist and the transverse carpal ligament.

Pressure can interrupt or arrest the microcirculatory environment of the nerve starting a pathophysiological cascade. As the heart beats, it pushes blood through arteries/arterioles/capillaries. Blood also travels through veins though more passively via valves and the assistance of muscles to squeeze veins. If there is localized pressure high enough, it can interrupt the normal flow of blood.

For compression to affect nerve function, pressure needs to be applied non-uniformly. For example, frogs can survive in isolated pressure chambers at high pressures but much lower local compression can block conduction of the nerve. Scuba divers can dive to tens of meters of water depth and will not experience any form of nerve compression, but the same pressure divers experience under 1 meter of water (pressure under 1m of water is 10k Pascal ~ 80mmHg) applied locally can completely arrest nerve function.

Compression is especially likely in anatomic tunnels or fibro-osseous spaces where there may be a conflict with the amount of free space available and the volume of the contents. If the tunnel narrows or if the contents of the tunnel expand, there will be an increase in pressure. Examples of tunnels are the carpal tunnel, tarsal tunnel, and cubital tunnel. Sometimes compression occurs in areas that are not considered tunnels and where a nerve passes between two mechanically stiffer tissue types that can squeeze or pinch the soft nerve. Examples include the lateral femoral cutaneous nerve at the inguinal ligament and the middle cluneal nerves at the long posterior sacroiliac ligament. The compression even be dynamic, where compression may only be present during certain activities and positions. In deep gluteal syndrome, patients often have sciatic radiculopathy when sitting but not standing.

Studies on compression and nerve function have found a dose-respondent relationship between pressure and duration. That is higher pressures and longer duration are associated with greater dysfunction. However even short but repeated periods of compression can also damage a nerve's microcirculatory environment. The amount of pressure required to cause nerve dysfunction starts at around 20mmHg where epineural venus blood flow is reduced. At 30mmHg anterograde and retrograde axonal transport is impaired. Between 30-50mmHg there will usually be changes in intraneural blood flow, axonal transport, and vascular permeability simultaneously. And at 80mmHg all intraneural blood flow is arrested, which results in a complete metabolic block. The amount of pressure required to disrupt intraneural blood flow isn't an absolute pressure but rather a function of the arterial blood pressure and perfusion pressure. Patients with higher blood pressures are somewhat protected from the effects of nerve entrapment by requiring higher pressures to interrupt intraneural blood flow. If these same patients are treated successfully for their hypertension, they may develop symptoms if they already had some latent, subclinical form of nerve compression.

=== Tension ===
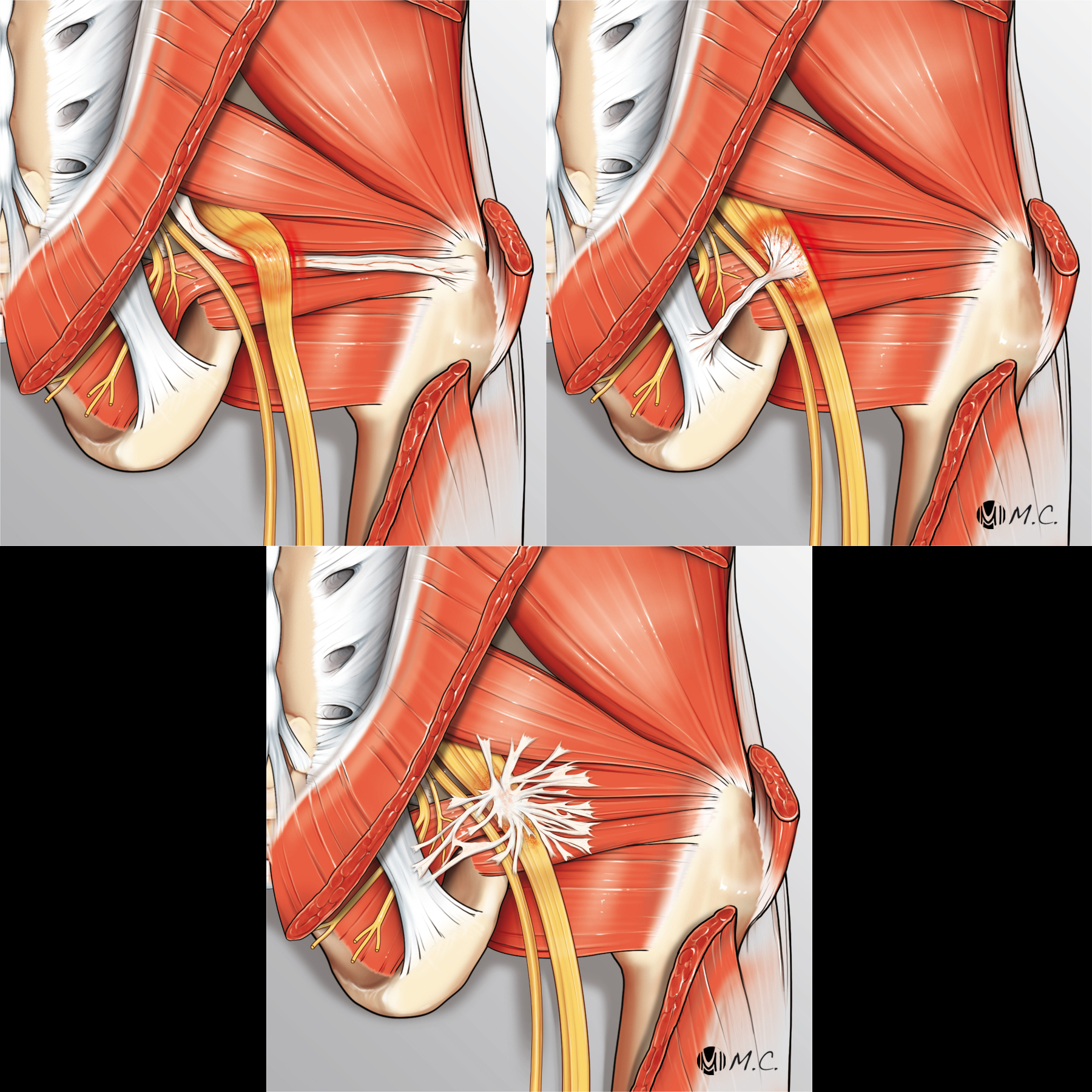
Fibrovascular bands are dense bands of scar tissue with a vascular supply that can restrict mobility of the sciatic nerve. Top left is a compressive / bridge-type band, like a seat belt. Top right is an adhesive / horse-strap band, like a leash. Bottom center is undefined distribution that restricts mobility in multiple directions, like a splattering of glue.

Peripheral nerves frequently glide during movement of the extremities. For example, the brachial plexus can move up to 50mm with abduction and adduction of the shoulder. The median/ulnar nerves move 7.3mm and 9.8mm during elbow flexion and extension at the elbow. The median nerve moves 9.6mm with wrist flexion and extension. This nerve movement also applies to the spinal nerves, which can stretch and slacken with movement of the spine. This nerve gliding happens at intraneurial and extraneurial tissue planes. Outside the nerve, a thin layer of tissue similar to adventitia surrounds the nerve upon which the epineurial surface glides. Inside the nerve, fascicles can glide against each other.

Inhibition of normal gliding at these tissue planes can lead to repetitive stretch injuries during movements. Studies on rabbit sciatic nerves have found that even a 6% acute stretch can lead to significant impairment with recovery and a 12% acute stretch can lead to complete impairment and no immediate recovery. A single adhesion tethers the nerve in two directions - between the spinal root to the adhesion and between the adhesion to the terminal branches. These injuries will lead to edema and fibrosis, not just in the nerve but also the surrounding tissues touching the nerve, which may further inhibit normal nerve gliding in a vicious cycle.

The most commonly understood mechanism of impaired nerve gliding is through the formation of scar tissue that adheres separate tissue planes. It is not always clear how the initial scar tissue forms, but once formed there is a clear path for the formation of further scar tissue - movement can cause stretch injuries at the soft tissue attachments of the adhesion, triggering edema and further fibrosis of the nerve bed and potentially extending within the nerve itself. In deep gluteal syndrome, scar issue is the most common cause of sciatic nerve entrapment.

== Pathogenesis ==
The pathophysiology of entrapment is complex because nerve tissue has many components (e.g. axon, myelin, endoneurium, perineurium, epineurium, blood vessels, etc) that may respond differently to various stressors affecting nerve function. The underlying mechanism of injury typically starts with interruptions in vascular supply. Both the acute and chronic forms of nerve entrapment involve initial changes in the microcirculatory environment. For the acute model, the sequence of events is typically an interruption of the blood supply followed by a metabolic block as the nerve stops functioning. For the chronic model, the sequence of events is a breakdown in the blood-nerve-barrier, followed by endoneurial edema and connective tissue fibrosis, followed by demyelination, and finally axonmetesis.

=== Acute compression ===
==== Mechanical injury ====
Direct pressure can physically deform the structure of the nerve. Local pressure can create a bidirectional displacement of nerve tissue from away from the area of compression by squishing the compressed tissue outwards. Studies using a cuff to compress a nerve have found the earliest and most severe injuries at the edge of the cuff, and this is called the "edge effect". The physical basis for the edge effect is believed to be a pressure gradient that deforms and then injures nerve tissue, and the pressure gradient is highest at the edges. At a microscopic level, intraneural blood vessels and nerve fibers are displaced longitudinally by shear strain. Surprisingly, smaller nerve fibers are more resistant to compression than large nerve fibers.

==== Metabolic block ====
Nerve function depends on its blood supply. Arresting or inhibiting the blood supply can deprive nerve tissue of oxygen and other essential nutrients to induce a metabolic block, whereby the nerve is unable to function. This block is purely a physiologic problem such that the structure of the nerve is unchanged. If the metabolic block is short in duration, it is completely reversible with no permanent effects. An example of a metabolic block is when a limb "falls asleep" (temporary numbness, paresthesia, and weakness) due to the position of a limb that restricts blood flow. Complete ischema, such as the application of a tourniquet, is followed by hyperexcitability and then loss of nerve function over 60-90 minutes. The ischema is immediately reversible when the block is released, as long as the duration of ischema is not too long, such as 1-2 hours.

The first sign of impairment to intraneural blood flow occurs in the epineural blood vessels at about 20-30mm Hg pressure. At pressures of 60-80mmHg there will be complete ischemia. A metabolic block can also be induced by stretching. In animal studies, venous statis was seen at an 8% stretch and at a 15% stretch the blood supply was completely arrested.

It's a frequent occurrence that patients receiving a nerve decompression see an immediate improvement in their symptoms, and this is thought to be the restoration of blood flow after a metabolic block as other forms of functional nerve impairment such as neuropraxia and axonmetesis take longer to recover.

=== Chronic compression ===
Like acute compression, chronic compression starts with the impairment of the microcirculatory environment. Studies on pressure have identified a "critical pressure level", above which the nerve is significantly impaired. This pressure level is 30mmHg below diastolic or 45mmHg below systolic blood pressure. Interestingly, patients with higher blood pressure require larger compressive forces to interrupt the microcirculatory environment.

==== Breakdown of blood-nerve barrier ====
Intraneural blood vessels, similar to other microvessels in the human body, increase their permeability in response to stress. During extended periods of metabolic stress, such as ischema caused by compression, the blood-nerve-barrier will increase in permeability. This increase in the permeability in the blood-nerve-barrier is the first pathological symptom observed during compression studies.

==== Edema and connective tissue changes ====
As the blood-nerve-barrier breaks down, proteins and cells will be able to enter the perineural and endoneurial space. The increased permeability allowing substances to enter combined with the lack of a lymphatic system to drain fluids causes an increase in pressure and may alter the ionic environment. The increased pressure in the endoneurium can cause a mini "compartment syndrome" leading to post-traumatic ischemia of the nerve cells. When endoneurial edema is triggered, the swelling will last many hours the point that the entrapment is relieved. For example, following 2-8 hours of compression, endoneurial fluid pressure will rapidly rise and can stay elevated for 24 hours.

Lymphocytes, fibroblasts, and macrophages will also be able to cross the newly permeable blood nerve barrier and react to the antigens contained in the perineural space triggering an inflammatory reaction. As part of this inflammatory reaction, there will be excess deposits of fibrin (i.e. scarring). On histological analysis, epineural fibrosis and perineural thickening can be seen. This scarring is an irreversible change associated with nerve entrapment. If the scarring damages the microcirculatory environment, then the impaired blood supply will also be permanent. In cases where permanent impairment exists even after a nerve decompression, it's thought that the pathophysiological basis is due to extensive scarring along and within the nerve, as demyelination and axonmetesis are generally capable of healing but scarring cannot be reversed.

==== Demyelination ====
By the time chronic nerve compression becomes symptomatic, myelin tissue in the area of compression is likely damaged triggering a process called demyelination. This only affects the myelin sheath on myelinated axon while the axon and nerve continuity will remain preserved. Loss of myelin is often readily seen in histological samples as the layer of myelin around myelinated nerves will appear very thin, representing either the late stages of demyelination or early stages of remyelination.

The pathology of fascicle to fascicle can vary. For example in some studies the central fascicles have appeared normal, while the peripheral fascicles showed significant thinning of myelin. Even within a fascicle, demyelination does not affect nerves uniformly. For example, in the early stages, demyelination can be seen at the edge of fascicles near the periphery of the nerve, and in later stages the demyelination is diffusely seen within the entirety of a fasicle.

Damage to the myelin sheath of nerves is a nerve injury. It's classified as neuropraxia or a type 1 nerve injury using the Sunderland classification. It can cause a local conduction block for weeks to months as the myelin sheaths regrow, assuming no reinjury which would prolong recovery.

==== Axon injury ====
For severe nerve entrapment, nerve axons can be injured to the point of destruction. Axon injury is also known as axonmetesis or a Sunderland type 2 nerve injury where the endoneurial tubes are preserved. If an axon is injured, the axonal transport system may not function. Since the axon depends on its connection to the cell body, the disrupted axonal transport will cause segmental death of the axon distal to the injury site in a process called Wallerian degeneration. This will result in a complete conduction block, leading to muscle weakness (motor nerve) or numbness (sensory nerve). Provided that the endoneurial tube is not disrupted, there is still a pathway for the axon at the injury site to regrow, but the growth is very slow (approximately 1mm/day). Recovery can take months and is often partial.

== Clinical correlation ==
Nerve entrapment is a complex lesion involving the multiple tissue types in a fascicle. There may be mixed lesions where individual tissue lesions contribute to the whole of the symptoms. Tissue injury may contribute to positive and/or negative symptoms, which can be attributed to the loss of nerve function and the hyperexcitability of nerve tissue. Additionally, nerve fibers may be differently affected by compression/ischema depending on their size, location and topography. Studies on human tissues have no found a clear correlation between the amount of structural damage to a nerve and the degree of symptoms. Patients can have significant symptoms without nerve fiber changes.

=== Negative symptoms ===
Negative symptoms are those for which function is lost: muscle weakness, atrophy, numbness, diminished or absent reflexes. These symptoms represent a conduction blockade where nerve signals can't be adequately transmitted along the length of the nerve. These symptoms are caused specifically by metabolic blocks, demyelination, and axonmetesis. A metabolic block is the temporary deprivation of nourishment from the blood supply which is readily reversed if the ischema does not last too long. Demyelination will interfere with conduction of signals along the nerve. Axonmetesis will result in a complete conduction block as Wallerian degeneration will destroy every part of the axon distal to the lesion if/until the axon regrows completely to its most distal innervation target.

=== Positive symptoms ===
Positive symptoms are those for which function is gained: paresthesias, increased sensitivity, pain, muscle spasms, fasciculations. The symptoms represent hyperexcitability of a nerve where a signal is sent along a nerve due to a lower threshold for activation resulting in spontaneous signals. Demyelination can cause positive sensory symptoms such as pain due to increased ectopic firing. Demyelinated nerve tissue has been found to have a lower activation threshold for sending a signal, specifically for mechanosensitivity (e.g. light touch). While is some debate about the role of central nervous system sensitization in painful entrapment neuropathies, the success of peripheral nerve blocks suggests a peripheral nerve origin of this neuropathic pain.

== Degree of nerve injury ==
As the majority of nerve entrapment doesn't affect the structural integrity of the endoneurium, perineurium, or epineurium, the nerve injuries from nerve entrapment will primarily be type I or II in the Sunderland classification. As nerve entrapment can leave individual nerves in different stages of injury, mixed lesions may be present. For example, mild/moderate entrapment may largely see an overlap of metabolic block and type I injury (local myelin sheath damage). Moderate/severe entrapment may see type I and II injuries simultaneously (myelin sheath damage and axon damage).

== Double crush syndrome ==
Double crush syndrome is a theory of nerve injury first proposed by Upton and Thomas in 1972. The double crush theory is considered to be somewhat controversial, as there are disagreements over its existence and the underlying mechanisms that could produce it. It posits that neural function is impaired because single axons, having been compressed at one site, are susceptible to further neuropathy due to injury at another site. This is due to impairment of the anterograde axonal transport mechanism, and with multiple lesions impairing anterograde axonal transport, the anterograde transport system will be most impacted just distal to the most distal entrapment. The basis of this theory was the high rate of cervical radiculopathy seen in patients with carpal tunnel syndrome. Conceptually, this is analogous to multiple water filters in a filtration system (one for large particles, one for bacteria, etc). The water will be cleanest just past the last filter, but the filtration was due to the combined effects of the separate filters. To disable filtration, each of the filters must be removed rather than the last filter.

The structure of peripheral nerves includes a small cell body at the spinal cord, and a very long axon that extends all the way to the innervation target. These nerves are as long as 1-1.5 meters (sciatic nerve). Most of the substances the axon needs to survive is manufactured in the cell body. The axon's survival depends on its connection with the cell body, supported by the axonal transport mechanisms to carry cellular material. The axonal transport system carries material along the axon in both directions (anterograde and retrograde) at different speeds (fast and slow). The fast transport travels at up to 400 mm/day. The slow transport is less than 8 mm/day. During compression not severe enough to cause axonmetesis (not destroy the axon), the axons will maintain their structural integrity but experience degraded function in the axonal transport systems. Studies have found that pressures as low as 30mmHg can impair axonal transport.

The double-crush theory originally referred to anterograde axonal transport. For example, a spinal compressive lesion was posited to increase susceptibility to more distal compressive lesions like carpal tunnel. There is a complimentary reverse double-crush theory which refers to retrograde axonal transport.

== Role of scar tissue ==
Extensive scar tissue formation is a major cause of nerve entrapment, and for deep gluteal syndrome (entrapment of the sciatic nerve in the deep gluteal space), it's the most common cause. While the concept of scar tissue causing traction injuries is widely accepted, its role is more complex than strictly causing stretching injuries. Scar tissue itself is very dense and is capable of applying pressure on a nerve through bands (like a seat belt) or creating a fibrous tunnel that is capable of pinching the nerve under pressure due to its toughness. In advanced cases, scar tissue can be found in all layers of the nerve impairing blood flow and essential functions of various tissue types. This is to say that scar tissue is fairly robust in its capability to injure nerves. It can do so through traction (fibrovascular attachments), compression (osteofibrous tunnels), or can be associated with an inflammatory response that injured tissue (fibrosis).

== See also ==
- Nerve
- Nerve compression syndrome
- Demyelination
- Nerve injury classification
- Carpal tunnel syndrome
- Piriformis syndrome
- Deep gluteal syndrome
