= Epineurial repair =

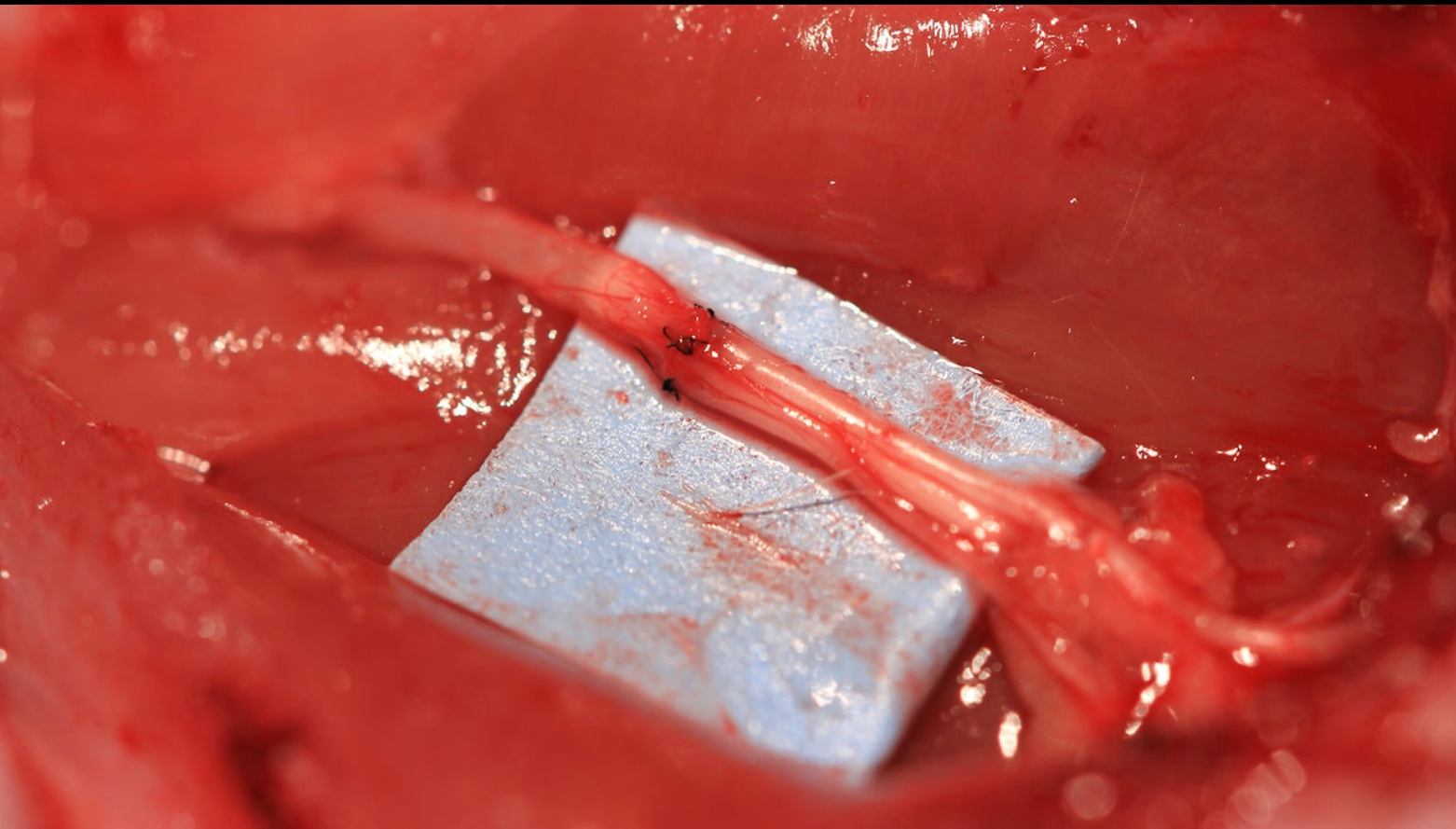
- Repair to epineurium via epineurial repair
- Specialty: Neurology

Epineurial repair is a common surgical procedure to repair a nerve laceration via the epineurium, the connective tissue surrounding nerve fibers originating from the spinal cord. It is intended to allow the restoration of sensory function. When a nerve is lacerated or cut, repair is done by sewing the cut ends together through the epineurium to increase the potential of the proximal part growing correctly along the route the degrading distal part leaves behind. Usual sensation and mobility will not be an immediate result because nerves grow at a rate of approximately 1 millimeter per day, so it will take a few months to notice the final outcome. Research in use of nerve grafts and nerve growth factors is being done to speed recovery time.

== Reasons ==
A nerve injury in continuity results when axonal function is nonexistent but the structure of the connective tissue is preserved. More severe nerve injury like axonotmesis or neurotmesis warrant the repair of the epineurium because the connective tissue is damaged. The epineurium is preserved in a nerve injury in continuity by definition and the severity of the injury varies with the amount of the connective tissue preserved. Typical indications for surgery are if the patient who presented with a laceration has no conduction along the axon, signal transmitted across the nerve, or does not recover within a week. Numbness and paralysis varies depending on the amount of functional loss due to the axonal interruption. The lack of signal being sent from the brain across the gap is caused by the laceration. The procedure can be applied to any nerve epineurium. The procedure is used to repair different-sized fascicles and non-grouped fascicles compared to group fascicular and perineurial repair.

== Challenges ==
Glial scars can have detrimental effects to neuronal regrowth to aide in the restoration of sensory function. Astrocytes form a barrier preventing further growth by forming gap junctions along with producing molecules that chemically prevent axon extension.

Tension in the rejoined nerve may stretch the epineurium and rip the two parts from each other again. Even tension along the sutured joint is necessary for an even repair.

The results of gaining motor function cannot guarantee results. The amount of scarring and size of the gap influences the results of the repair. The larger the gap, the less likelihood of recovery because more axon would have to grow further and astrocytes could develop over the longer length of time it takes to grow than with a shorter gap. In order to reduce the length of time for regeneration, further research is being conducted to speed regeneration such as nerve grafts and stem cells.

== Approach ==
Detailed descriptions of epineural repair focus on removal of scar and apposition of healthy tissue. After removal of scarred nerve tissue, the nerve is freed from surrounding soft tissues and its course may be shifted to allow the free ends to meet more easily. Initial sutures are placed on opposite sides of the joint, through the epineurium and slightly into the subepineurial neural structure to anchor the two nerves together. Suturing continues 180 degrees from each initial suture. The position of the lateral sutures is reversed to expose the opposite side and sutured the same way. Glue can be used in the place of some sutures to limit scarring, resulting in better axonal growth, and speed up the surgery. If it is needed to bend the body part in any position to bring the nerve ends together, the patient is instructed to maintain this position for 10–14 days in order not to disrupt the repair.

== Recovery ==
The length and efficiency of recovery is depended on the regenerative process that may require 6 to 18 months. The length of the nerve and site of the injury influences the recovery time. To avoid tension during recovery (generally 10–14 days), minimizing movement of the nerve may reduce risk of further damage. Regaining motor function is the intended result. Typical axon regrowth amounts to approximately 1 millimeter per day. Signs of recovery may present quickly, which is thought to be due to so-called "pioneer axons", axons that arrive at the recovery site along the pathway ahead of the rest of the nerve fibers. Nerve growth factors and nerve grafts can also be used to increase the speed of the regenerative process.

== Related procedures ==
Cross Section of Epineurium
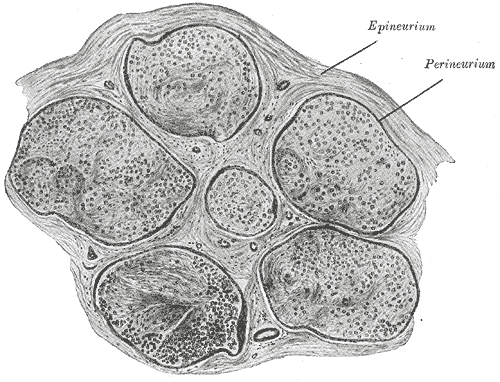
- Transverse section of human tibial nerve. (Epineurium labeled at upper right.)

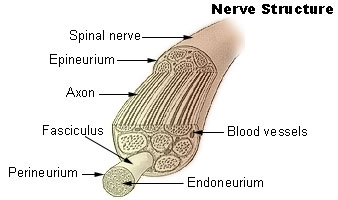
- Nerve structure

Perineurial repair involves the individual fascicles and placing sutures through the perineurium, the protective sheath surrounding fascicles, the nerve fibers enclosed by the perineurium. Trauma to the nerve by cutting out each fascicle and fibrosis, a build up of tissue as a reaction, that develops due to the dissections and number of sutures is a problem. Group fascicular repair involves suturing group fascicles in the intraneural epineurium to line up the groups of fascicles. This is only applicable when fascicles are grouped. Intraneural scarring due to the amount of dissection and manipulation of the repair is a potential result that may counteract the advantage of alignment of the fascicles.

Epineurial repair was shown to be as good as perineurial repair in acute nerve laceration, a small cut to the nerve, in cats by evaluating the ambulation pattern, fanning of claws and sensation. The objective measures were efficiency, absolute strength and weight of the flexor carpi ulnaris muscle. The anterior tibial nerves of dogs were cut to determine which of fascicular, interfascicular and epineural suture techniques were best. There was not a significant difference between the results of fascicular and epineural, but a significant difference between the two and interfascicular. In a study of 18 children with a 2:1 ratio of male to female, the children showed a recovery of motor and sensory functions assessed by the Bruininks–Oseretsky test, a test used to measure motor skills such as balance or cutting out a circle from a piece of paper.

== Perspectives ==
=== Growth factors ===
Research for the use of neurotrophic factors such as N-acetylmuramyl-L-alanyl-D-isoglutamine (MDP) to aide in the nerve regeneration was started in 2011. Assessments using a grasp test (a test to measure how well an object is grab) were performed weekly for 12 weeks in order to know functional recovery of the flexor muscle (the muscle that is flexed when the end of the finger is brought to the palm) in fingers along with median nerve regeneration. The results showed that MDP with fibrin tissue adhesive (FTA) and epineurial sutures were the best performing group among the sutures and sutures combined with FTA.

=== Artificial nerve grafts ===
When nerve repair cannot be performed without tension, nerve grafting can be used and is considered the most suitable treatment of peripheral nerve injuries, injuries to nerves outside of the brain and spinal cord. Nerve grafts are used to avoid tension at the proximal and distal ends, to reduce the likelihood of postoperative distraction. A nerve graft will be about 10 percent longer than the gap between the nerves, and the cross-section of the nerve end will be a quite larger than the diameter of the nerve graft to allow for growth. The use of harvested nerve grafts from a donor nerve provider contain Schwann cells and basal lamina endoneurial tubes that provide growth factors and surfaces for molecules to regenerate the axons.

Sensory loss, scarring and neuroma formation can cause morbidity to the donor site of the patient the nerve is harvested from. Therefore, alloplastic nerve graft research is being conducted for nerve repair. Silicone has been used previously, but long-term use of tubes produces compression and decreased conduction, requiring surgery to remove the tube. Conduits made from polyglycolic acid, a bioabsorbable substance used for dissolvable sutures, reduce the problems associated with silicone and eliminate problems associated with nerve grafts taken from donors. In a study on nerve repair comparing nerve grafts and polyglycolic acid conduits, there was no statistical differences, but 2-point discrimination showed that the conduit group was better at eliminating donor-site morbidity as a result of the graft.

=== Stem cells ===
Nerve tissue loss is associated with the more severe nerve injuries. 50-60% of sensory and motor neurons has been calculated from experiments after the use of nerve grafts Schwann cells form myelin, insulation to the nerve to allow better conduction along the axon, around the nerve fibers and secrete growth factors that play a major role in the regeneration process. The cells can align themselves to provide directional support to the regrowth of axons after injury and possibly increase the level of secretion of growth factors by being modified genetically. The time needed to grow and harvest the cells may be too long for less severe injury because it takes 10 weeks to culture or grow enough.

Cell therapy to improve nerve regeneration is also being researched. In one study mononuclear cells, cells with one nucleus, were used to repair the sciatic nerve, a large nerve running through the leg to the butt, followed by epineurial repair. Wistar rats were divided into groups of a control, epineurial sutures, medium after suture and injection of 10 microliters of medium into the nerve to allow for growth of cells still there, and mononuclear cells combined with medium after structure in the epineurium region. Results of sciatic functional index, histological and morphometric analyzes showed that the mononuclear group was the best.
