= Carpal tunnel syndrome =

Compression of the median nerve in the wrist

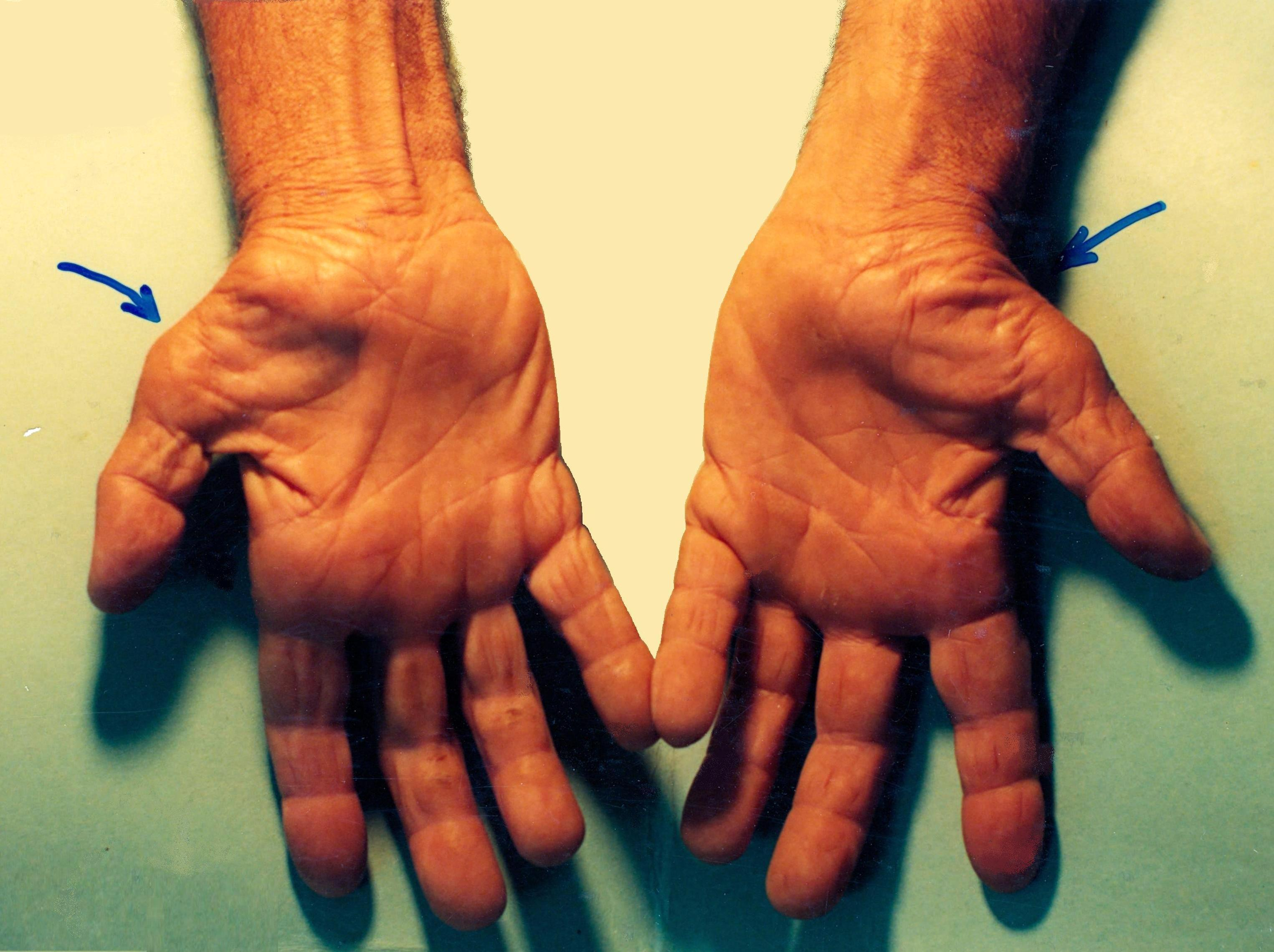
- Untreated carpal tunnel syndrome, showing shrinkage (atrophy) of the muscles at the base of the thumb
- Specialty: Orthopedic surgery, plastic surgery, neurology
- Symptoms: Numbness, tingling in the thumb, index, middle finger, and half of ring finger.
- Causes: Compression of the median nerve at the carpal tunnel
- Risk factors: Genetics, work tasks
- Diagnostic method: Based on symptoms, physical examinations, electrodiagnostic tests
- Differential diagnosis: Peripheral neuropathy, Radiculopathy, Plexopathy
- Prevention: None
- Treatment: Wrist splint, corticosteroid injections, surgery
- Frequency: 5–10%

Carpal tunnel syndrome (CTS) is the symptoms and signs characteristic of compressive median neuropathy at the carpal tunnel of the wrist. Compressive median neuropathy is a structural, largely hereditary condition that is usually measurable in both wrists. Most cases of median neuropathy at the carpal tunnel are idiopathic, meaning there is no known cause. Other causes of median nerve compression at the carpal tunnel include bleeding, swelling, and deformity associated with a wrist fracture. Carpal tunnel syndrome can also occur with rheumatoid arthritis, due to the enlarged synovial lining of the tendons causing median nerve compression.

The main symptoms are numbness and tingling of the thumb, index finger, middle finger, and the thumb side of the ring finger, as well as pain in the hand and fingers. Symptoms are typically most troublesome at night. Many people sleep with their wrists bent, and the ensuing symptoms may lead to awakening. Wearing a wrist splint while sleeping or during the day can reduce pressure and ease symptoms. Untreated, and over years to decades, CTS causes loss of sensitivity, weakness, and shrinkage (atrophy) of the thenar muscles at the base of the thumb.

Work-related factors such as vibration, wrist extension or flexion, hand force, and repetitive strain are risk factors for CTS. Other risk factors include being female, obesity, diabetes, rheumatoid arthritis, thyroid disease, and genetics.

Diagnosis can be made with a high probability based on characteristic symptoms and signs. It can also be measured with electrodiagnostic tests.

Injection of corticosteroids may or may not alleviate symptoms better than simulated (placebo) injections. There is no evidence that corticosteroid injection sustainably alters the natural history of the disease, which seems to be a gradual progression of neuropathy. Surgery to cut the transverse carpal ligament is the only known disease modifying treatment.

== Anatomy ==
The carpal tunnel is an anatomical compartment located at the base of the palm. Nine flexor tendons and the median nerve pass through the carpal tunnel, which is surrounded on three sides by the carpal bones that form an arch. The median nerve provides feeling or sensation to the thumb, index finger, long finger, and half of the ring finger. At the level of the wrist, the median nerve supplies the muscles at the base of the thumb that allow it to abduct, move away from the other four fingers, as well as move out of the plane of the palm. The carpal tunnel is located at the middle third of the base of the palm, bounded by the bony prominence of the scaphoid tubercle and trapezium at the base of the thumb, and the hamate hook that can be palpated along the axis of the ring finger. From the anatomical position, the carpal tunnel is bordered on the anterior surface by the transverse carpal ligament, also known as the flexor retinaculum. The flexor retinaculum is a strong, fibrous band that attaches to the pisiform and the hamulus of the hamate. The proximal boundary is the distal wrist skin crease, and the distal boundary is approximated by a line known as Kaplan's cardinal line. This line uses surface landmarks, and is drawn between the apex of the skin fold between the thumb and index finger to the palpated hamate hook.

== Pathophysiology ==
Transverse section at the right wrist. The median nerve is colored yellow. The carpal tunnel consists of the bones and transverse carpal ligament.

The carpal bones and the transverse carpal ligament form the carpal tunnel. The median nerve passes through this space along with the flexor tendons. Increased compartmental pressure for any reason can squeeze the median nerve. Theoretically, increased pressure can interfere with normal intraneural blood flow, eventually causing a cascade of physiological changes in the nerve itself. There is a dose-respondent curve such that greater and longer periods of pressure are associated with greater nerve dysfunction. The symptoms and signs of carpal tunnel syndrome causes are hypertrophy of the synovial tissue surrounding the flexor tendons such as with rheumatoid arthritis.

Prolonged pressure can lead to a cascade of physiological changes in neural tissue. First, the blood-nerve barrier breaks down (increased permeability of perineureum and endothelial cells of endoneural blood vessels). If the pressure continues, the nerves will start the process of demyelination under the area of compression. This will result in abnormal nerve conduction even when the pressure is relieved leading to persistent sensory symptoms until remyelination can occur. If the compression continues and is severe enough, axons may be injured and Wallerian degeneration will occur. At this point there may be weakness and muscle atrophy, depending on the extent of axon damage.

The critical pressure above which the microcirculatory environment of a nerve becomes compromised depends on diastolic/systolic blood pressure. Higher blood pressure will require higher external pressure on the nerve to disrupt its microvascular environment. The critical pressure necessary to disrupt the blood supply of a nerve is approximately 30mm Hg below diastolic blood pressure or 45mm Hg below mean arterial pressure. For normohypertensive (normal blood pressure) adults, the average values for systolic blood pressure is 116mm Hg diastolic blood pressure is 69mm Hg. Using this data, the average person would become symptomatic with approximately 39mm Hg of pressure in the wrist (69 - 30 = 39 and 69 + (116 - 69)/3 - 45 ~ 40). Carpal tunnel syndrome patients tend to have elevated carpal tunnel pressures (12-31mm Hg) compared to controls (2.5 - 13mm Hg). Applying pressure to the carpal tunnel of normal subjects in a lab can produce mild neurophysiological changes at 30mm Hg with a rapid, complete sensory block at 60mm Hg. Carpal tunnel pressure may be affected by wrist movement/position, with flexion and extension capable of raising the tunnel pressure as high as 111mm Hg. Many of the activities associated with carpal tunnel symptoms such as driving, holding a phone, etc. involve flexing the wrist and it is likely due to an increase in carpal tunnel pressure during these activities.

Nerve compression can result in various stages of nerve injury. The majority of carpal tunnel syndrome patients have a degree I nerve injury (Sunderland classification), also called neuropraxia. This is characterized by a conduction block, segmental demyelination, and intact axons. With no further compression, the nerves will remyelinate and fully recover. Severe carpal tunnel syndrome patients may have degree II/III injuries (Sunderland classification), or axonotmesis, where the axon is injured partially or fully. With axon injury, there would be muscle weakness or atrophy, and with no further compression, the nerves may only partially recover.

While there is evidence that chronic compression is a major cause of carpal tunnel syndrome, it may not be the only cause. Nerve scarring (specifically adherence between the mesoneurium and epineureum) may prevent the nerve from gliding during wrist or finger movements, causing repetitive traction injuries. Another is the double crush syndrome, where compression may interfere with axonal transport, and two separate points of compression (e.g. neck and wrist), neither enough to cause local demyelination, may together impair normal nerve function.

== Epidemiology ==
Carpal tunnel syndrome is estimated to affect one out of ten people during their lifetime and is the most common nerve compression syndrome. There is notable variation in such estimates based on how one defines the problem, in particular, whether one studies people presenting with symptoms vs. measurable median neuropathy, whether or not people are seeking care. Idiopathic neuropathy accounts for about 90% of all nerve compression syndromes.

== Signs and symptoms ==
The characteristic symptom is numbness, tingling, or burning sensations in the thumb, index, middle, and radial half of the ring finger. These areas process sensation through the median nerve. Numbness or tingling is usually worse with sleep. People tend to sleep with their wrists flexed, which increases pressure on the nerve. Ache and discomfort may be reported in the forearm or even the upper arm. Symptoms that are not as characteristic of CTS include pain in the wrists or hands, loss of grip strength, minor loss of sleep, and loss of manual dexterity.

Severe CTS is associated with measurable loss of sensibility. As the median neuropathy progresses, there is loss of sensibility in the thumb, index, middle, and the thumb side of the ring finger. As the neuropathy progresses, there may be first weakness, then atrophy of the muscles of thenar eminence (the flexor pollicis brevis, opponens pollicis, and abductor pollicis brevis). The sensibility of the palm remains normal because the superficial sensory branch of the median nerve branches proximal to the transverse carpal ligament (TCL) and travels superficial to it.

Median nerve symptoms may arise from nerve compression at the level of the thoracic outlet or the area where the median nerve passes between the two heads of the pronator teres in the forearm, although this is debated.

Severe CTS is also associated with weakness and atrophy of the muscles at the base of the thumb. The ability to abduct the thumb may be lost.

A person with idiopathic carpal tunnel syndrome will not have any sensory loss over the thenar eminence (bulge of muscles in the palm of the hand and at the base of the thumb). This is because the palmar branch of the median nerve, which innervates that area of the palm, separates from the median nerve and passes over the carpal tunnel.

== Causes ==
Most presentations of CTS have no known disease cause (idiopathic).

The association of other factors with CTS is a source of notable debate. It is important to distinguish factors that provoke symptoms and factors that are associated with seeking care from factors that make the neuropathy worse.

Genetic factors are believed to be the most important determinants of who develops carpal tunnel syndrome. In other words, one's wrist structure seems programmed at birth to develop CTS later in life. A genome-wide association study (GWAS) of carpal tunnel syndrome identified 50 genomic loci significantly associated with the disease, including several loci previously known to be associated with human height.

Some other factors that contribute to carpal tunnel syndrome are conditions such as diabetes, alcoholism, vitamin deficiency or toxicity as well as exposure to toxins. Conditions such as these don't necessarily increase the interstitial pressure of the carpal tunnel. One case-control study noted that individuals classified as obese (BMI >29) are 2.5 times more likely than slender individuals (BMI <20) to be diagnosed with CTS. It is not clear whether this association is due to an alteration of pathophysiology, a variation in symptoms, or a variation in care-seeking.

=== Discrete pathophysiology and CTS ===
Hereditary neuropathy with susceptibility to pressure palsies is a genetic condition that appears to increase the probability of developing CTS. Heterozygous mutations in the gene SH3TC2, associated with Charcot-Marie-Tooth, may confer susceptibility to neuropathy, including CTS.

Association between common benign tumors such as lipomas, ganglion, and vascular malformation should be handled with care. Such tumors are very common and are more likely to compress the median nerve. Similarly, the association between transthyretin amyloidosis-associated polyneuropathy and carpal tunnel syndrome is under investigation. Prior carpal tunnel release is often noted in individuals who later present with transthyretin amyloid-associated cardiomyopathy. There is consideration that bilateral carpal tunnel syndrome could be a reason to consider amyloidosis, timely diagnosis of which could improve heart health. Amyloidosis is rare, even among people with carpal tunnel syndrome (0.55% incidence within 10 years of carpal tunnel release). In the absence of other factors associated with a notable probability of amyloidosis, it is not clear that biopsy at the time of carpal tunnel release has a suitable balance between potential harms and potential benefits.

Other specific pathophysiologies that can cause CTS via pressure include:

- Rheumatoid arthritis and other diseases that cause inflammation of the flexor tendons.
- With severe untreated hypothyroidism, generalized myxedema causes deposition of mucopolysaccharides within both the perineurium of the median nerve, as well as the tendons passing through the carpal tunnel. Association of CTS with lesser degrees of hypothyroidism is questioned.
- Pregnancy may bring out symptoms in genetically predisposed individuals, which may be caused by the temporary changes in hormones and fluids, which increase pressure in the carpal tunnel. High progesterone levels and water retention may increase the size of the synovium.
- Bleeding and swelling from a fracture or dislocation. This is referred to as acute carpal tunnel syndrome.
- Acromegaly causes excessive secretion of growth hormones. This causes the soft tissues and bones around the carpal tunnel to grow and compress the median nerve.

==== Other considerations ====
- Double crush syndrome is a debated hypothesis that Nerve compression or irritation of nerve branches contributing to the median nerve in the neck, or anywhere above the wrist, increases sensitivity of the nerve to compression in the wrist. There is little evidence to support this theory and some concern that it may be used to justify more surgery.

=== CTS and activity ===
Work-related factors that increase risk of CTS include vibration (5.4 odds ratio), hand force (4.2), and repetition (2.3). Exposure to wrist extension or flexion at work increases the risk of CTS by 2.0 times. As of 2023, a systematic review of studies looking at the relationship between CTS and computer use has found current studies to be inconclusive and contradictory, due to poor study methods and confounding variables not being accounted for.

The international debate regarding the relationship between CTS and repetitive hand use (at work in particular) is ongoing. The Occupational Safety and Health Administration (OSHA) has adopted rules and regulations regarding so-called "cumulative trauma disorders" based concerns regarding potential harm from exposure to repetitive tasks, force, posture, and vibration.

A review of available scientific data by the National Institute for Occupational Safety and Health (NIOSH) indicated that job tasks that involve highly repetitive manual acts or specific wrist postures were associated with symptoms of CTS. There was no clear distinction between paresthesia (appropriate) from pain (inappropriate), and causation was not established. The distinction from work-related arm pains that are not carpal tunnel syndrome was unclear. It is proposed that repetitive use of the arm can affect the biomechanics of the upper limb or cause damage to tissues. It is proposed that postural and spinal assessment, along with ergonomic assessments, should be considered, based on the observation that addressing these factors has been found to improve comfort in some studies, although experimental data are lacking, and the perceived benefits may not be specific to those interventions. A 2010 survey by NIOSH showed that two-thirds of the 5 million carpal tunnel diagnoses in the US that year were related to work. Women are more likely to be diagnosed with work-related carpal tunnel syndrome than men. Many if not most patients described in published series of carpal tunnel release are older and often not working.

Normal pressure of the carpal tunnel has been defined as a range of 2–10 mm (0.079–0.394 in). Wrist flexion increases the pressure eight-fold and extension increases it ten-fold. There is speculation that repetitive flexion and extension in the wrist can cause thickening of the synovial tissue that lines the tendons within the carpal tunnel.

=== Associated conditions ===
A variety of patient factors can lead to CTS, including heredity, size of the carpal tunnel, associated local and systematic diseases, and certain habits. Non-traumatic causes generally happen over a period of time, and are not triggered by one certain event. Many of these factors are manifestations of physiologic aging.

== Diagnosis ==
There is no consensus standard for diagnosing carpal tunnel syndrome. A combination of characteristic symptoms (how it feels) and signs (what the clinician finds on exam) is associated with a high probability of CTS without electrophysiological testing. Sensation loss can be established using Semmes-Weinstein monofilament testing.

CTS can be detected on examination using one of several maneuvers to provoke paresthesia (a sensation of tingling or "pins and needles" in the median nerve distribution). These so-called provocative signs include:

- Phalen's maneuver. Performed by fully flexing the wrist, then holding this position and awaiting symptoms. A positive test results in paresthesia in the median nerve distribution within sixty seconds.
- Tinel's sign is performed by lightly tapping the median nerve just proximal to flexor retinaculum to elicit paresthesia.
- Durkan's test, carpal compression test, or applying firm pressure to the palm over the nerve for up to 30 seconds to elicit paresthesia.
- The hand elevation test, performed by lifting both hands above the head. Paresthesia in the median nerve distribution within 2 minutes is considered positive.

Diminished threshold sensibility (the ability to distinguish different amounts of pressure) can be measured using Semmes-Weinstein monofilament testing. This test establishes impaired or loss of sensation.

Electrodiagnostic testing including electromyography, and nerve conduction studies can objectively measure and verify median neuropathy.

Ultrasound can image and measure the cross-sectional diameter of the median nerve, which has some correlation with CTS. The role of ultrasound in diagnosis—just as with electrodiagnostic testing—is a matter of debate. Data suggests that electrodiagnostic testing cannot detect the presence of CTS in 16% to 34% of people who have the condition.

The role of confirmatory electrodiagnostic testing is controversial. The goal of electrodiagnostic testing is to compare the speed of conduction in the median nerve with conduction in other nerves supplying the hand. When the median nerve is compressed, it will conduct more slowly than normal and more slowly than other nerves. Nerve compression results in damage to the myelin sheath and manifests as delayed latencies and slowed conduction velocities. Electrodiagnosis rests upon demonstrating impaired median nerve conduction across the carpal tunnel in the context of normal conduction elsewhere.

It is often stated that normal electrodiagnostic studies do not preclude the diagnosis of carpal tunnel syndrome. The rationale for this is that a threshold of neuropathy must be reached before study results become abnormal, and also that threshold values for abnormality vary. Others contend that idiopathic median neuropathy at the carpal tunnel with normal electrodiagnostic tests would represent very, very mild neuropathy that would be best managed as a normal median nerve. Even more important, notable symptoms with mild disease are strongly associated with unhelpful thoughts and symptoms of worry and despair. Notable CTS should remind clinicians to always consider the whole person, including their mindset and circumstances, in strategies to help people get and stay healthy.

A report published by the American Association of Neuromuscular & Electrodiagnostic Medicine (AANEM), the American Academy of Physical Medicine and Rehabilitation (AAPM&R), and the American Academy of Neurology defines practice parameters, standards, and guidelines for electrodiagnostic testing studies of CTS based on an extensive critical literature review. This joint review concluded that median and sensory nerve conduction studies are valid and reproducible in a clinical laboratory setting, and a clinical diagnosis of CTS can be made with a sensitivity greater than 85% and specificity greater than 95%. The AANEM has issued evidence-based practice guidelines for the diagnosis of carpal tunnel syndrome, both by electrodiagnostic studies and by neuromuscular ultrasound.

=== Imaging ===
The role of MRI or ultrasound imaging in the diagnosis of CTS is unclear. Their routine use is not recommended. Morphological MRI has high sensitivity but low specificity for CTS. High signal intensity may suggest accumulation of axonal transport, myelin sheath degeneration, or edema. However, more recent quantitative MRI techniques, which derive repeatable, reliable, and objective biomarkers from nerves and skeletal muscle, may have utility, including diffusion-weighted (typically diffusion tensor) MRI, which has demonstrable normal values and aberrations in carpal tunnel syndrome.

=== Differential diagnosis ===
Cervical radiculopathy can also cause paresthesia and abnormal sensibility in the hands and wrist. The distribution usually follows the nerve root, and the paresthesia may be provoked by neck movement. Electromyography and imaging of the cervical spine can help to differentiate cervical radiculopathy from carpal tunnel syndrome if the diagnosis is unclear. Carpal tunnel syndrome is sometimes applied as a label to anyone with pain, numbness, swelling, or burning in the radial side of the hands or wrists. When pain is the primary symptom, carpal tunnel syndrome is unlikely to be the source of the symptoms.

When the symptoms and signs point to atrophy and muscle weakness more than numbness, consider neurodegenerative disorders such as Amyotrophic Lateral Sclerosis or Charcot-Marie Tooth.

== Prevention ==
There is little or no data to support the concept that activity adjustment prevents carpal tunnel syndrome. The evidence for using a wrist rest at a computer keyboard is debated. There is also little research supporting that ergonomics is related to carpal tunnel syndrome.

Given that biological factors, such as genetic predisposition and anthropometric features, are more strongly associated with carpal tunnel syndrome than occupational/environmental factors such as hand use, CTS may not be prevented by activity modifications.

Some claim that worksite modifications such as switching from a QWERTY computer keyboard layout to Dvorak are helpful, but meta-analyses of the available studies note limited supported evidence.

== Treatment ==
There are more than 50 types of treatments for CTS with varied levels of evidence and recommendations across healthcare guidelines, with evidence most strongly supporting surgery, steroids, splinting for wrist positioning, and physical or occupational therapy interventions. When selecting treatment, it is important to consider the severity and chronicity of the CTS pathophysiology and to distinguish treatments that can alter the natural history of the pathophysiology (disease-modifying treatments) and treatments that only alleviate symptoms (palliative treatments). The strongest evidence for disease-modifying treatment in chronic or severe CTS cases is carpal tunnel surgery to change the shape of the carpal tunnel.

The American Academy of Orthopedic Surgeons recommends proceeding conservatively with a course of nonsurgical therapies tried before release surgery is considered. A different treatment should be tried if the current treatment fails to resolve the symptoms within 2 to 7 weeks. Early surgery with carpal tunnel release is indicated where there is evidence of median nerve denervation or a person elects to proceed directly to surgical treatment. Recommendations may differ when carpal tunnel syndrome is found in association with the following conditions: diabetes mellitus, coexistent cervical radiculopathy, hypothyroidism, polyneuropathy, pregnancy, rheumatoid arthritis, and carpal tunnel syndrome in the workplace. CTS related to another pathophysiology is addressed by treating that pathology. For instance, disease-modifying medications for rheumatoid arthritis or surgery for traumatic acute carpal tunnel syndrome.

There is insufficient evidence to recommend gabapentin, non-steroidal anti-inflammatories (NSAIDs), yoga, acupuncture, low level laser therapy, magnet therapy, vitamin B6 or other supplements.

=== Splint immobilization ===
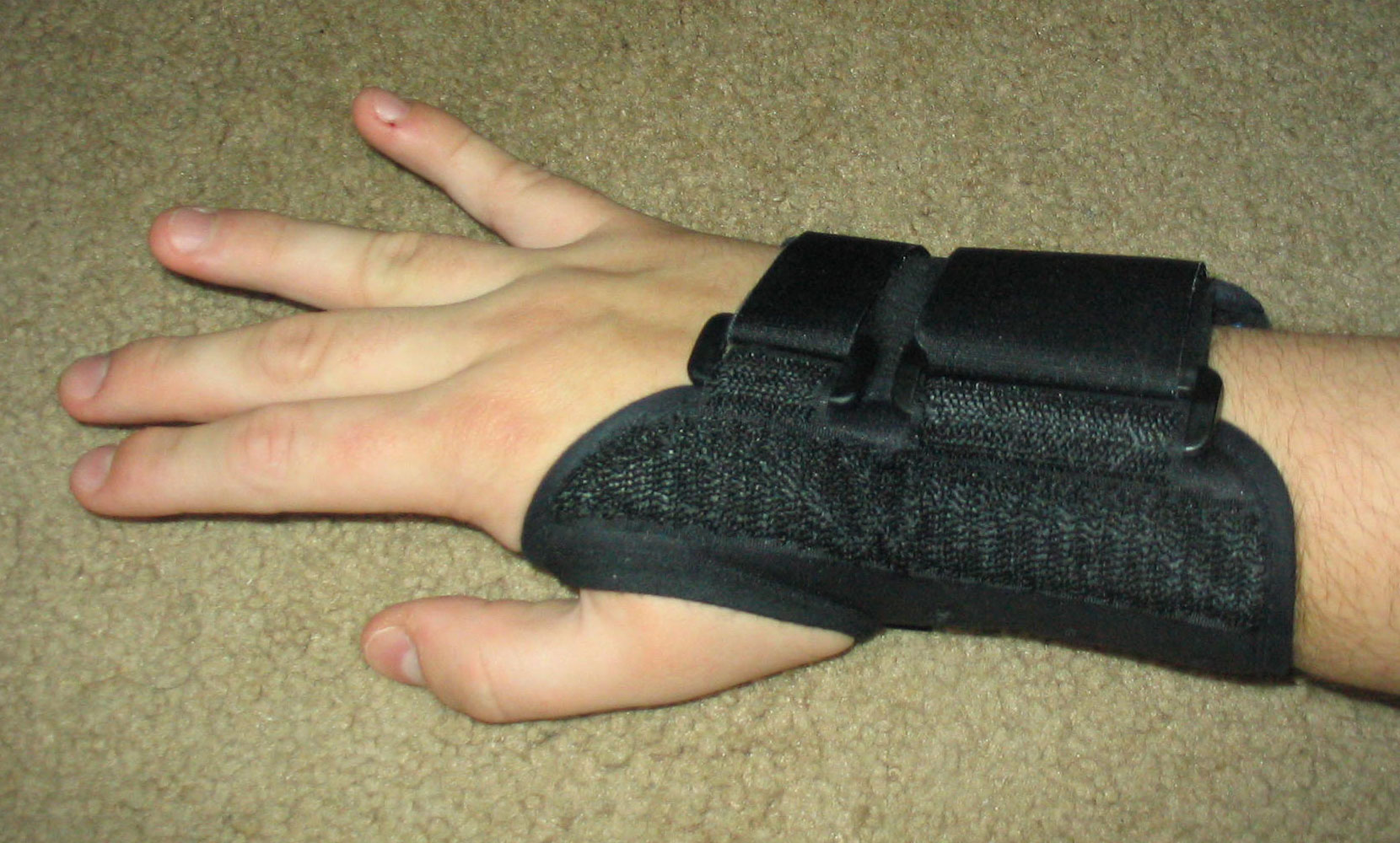
A rigid splint can keep the wrist straight.

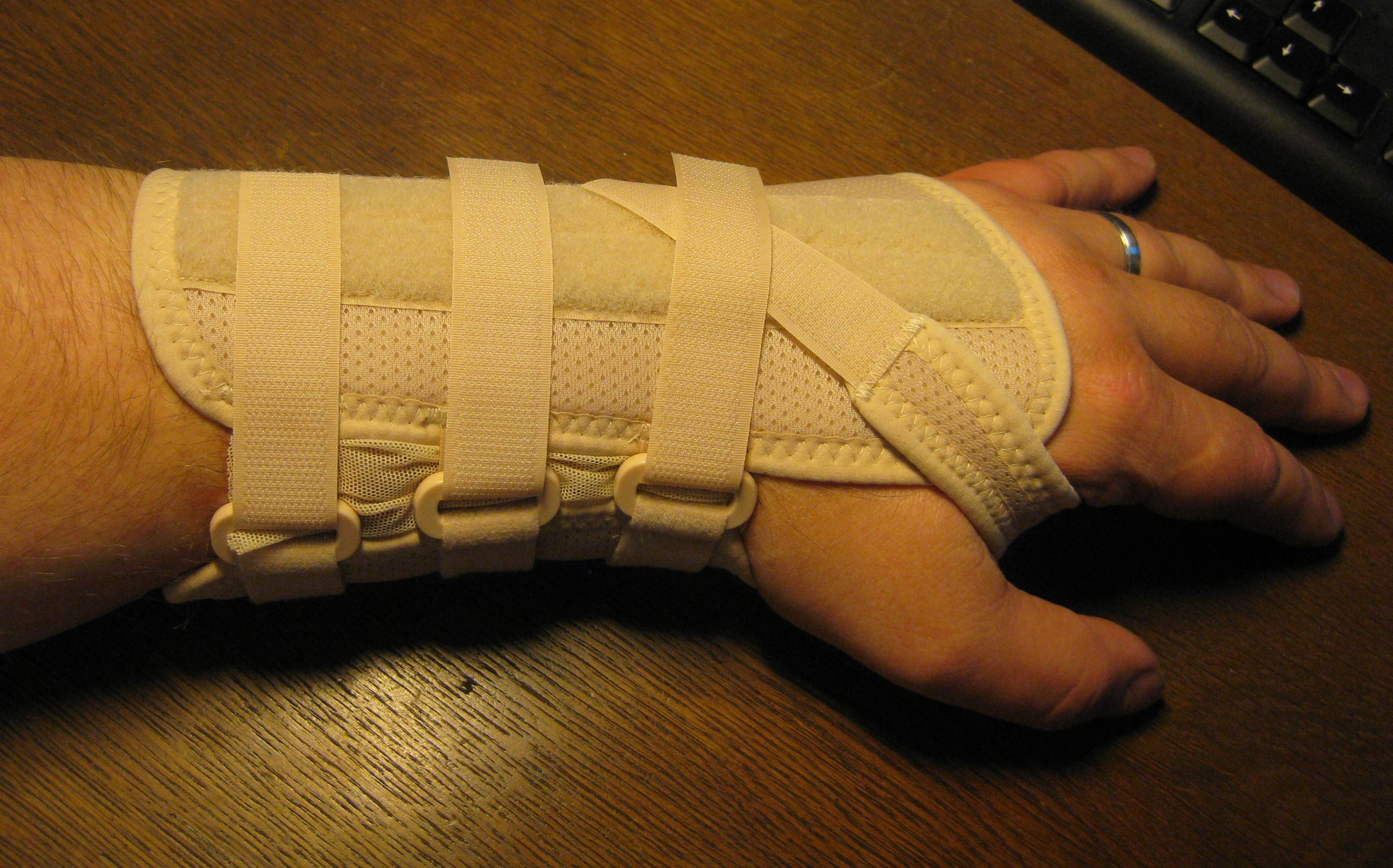
A different type of rigid splint used in carpal tunnel syndrome

Wrist braces (splints) alleviate symptoms by keeping the wrist straight, which avoids the increased pressure in the carpal tunnel associated with wrist flexion or extension. They are used primarily to help people sleep.

Many health professionals suggest that for the best results, one should wear braces at night. When possible, braces can be worn during the activity, primarily causing stress on the wrists. The brace should not generally be used during the day as wrist activity is needed to keep the wrist from becoming stiff and to prevent muscles from weakening.

=== Corticosteroids ===
Corticosteroid injections may provide temporary alleviation of symptoms, although they are not clearly better than a placebo. This form of treatment is thought to reduce discomfort in those with CTS due to its ability to decrease median nerve swelling. The use of ultrasound while performing the injection is more expensive but leads to faster resolution of CTS symptoms. The injections are done under local anesthesia. This treatment is not appropriate for extended periods, however. In general, local steroid injections are used until more definitive treatment options can be used. Corticosteroid injections do not appear to slow disease progression.

=== Surgery ===
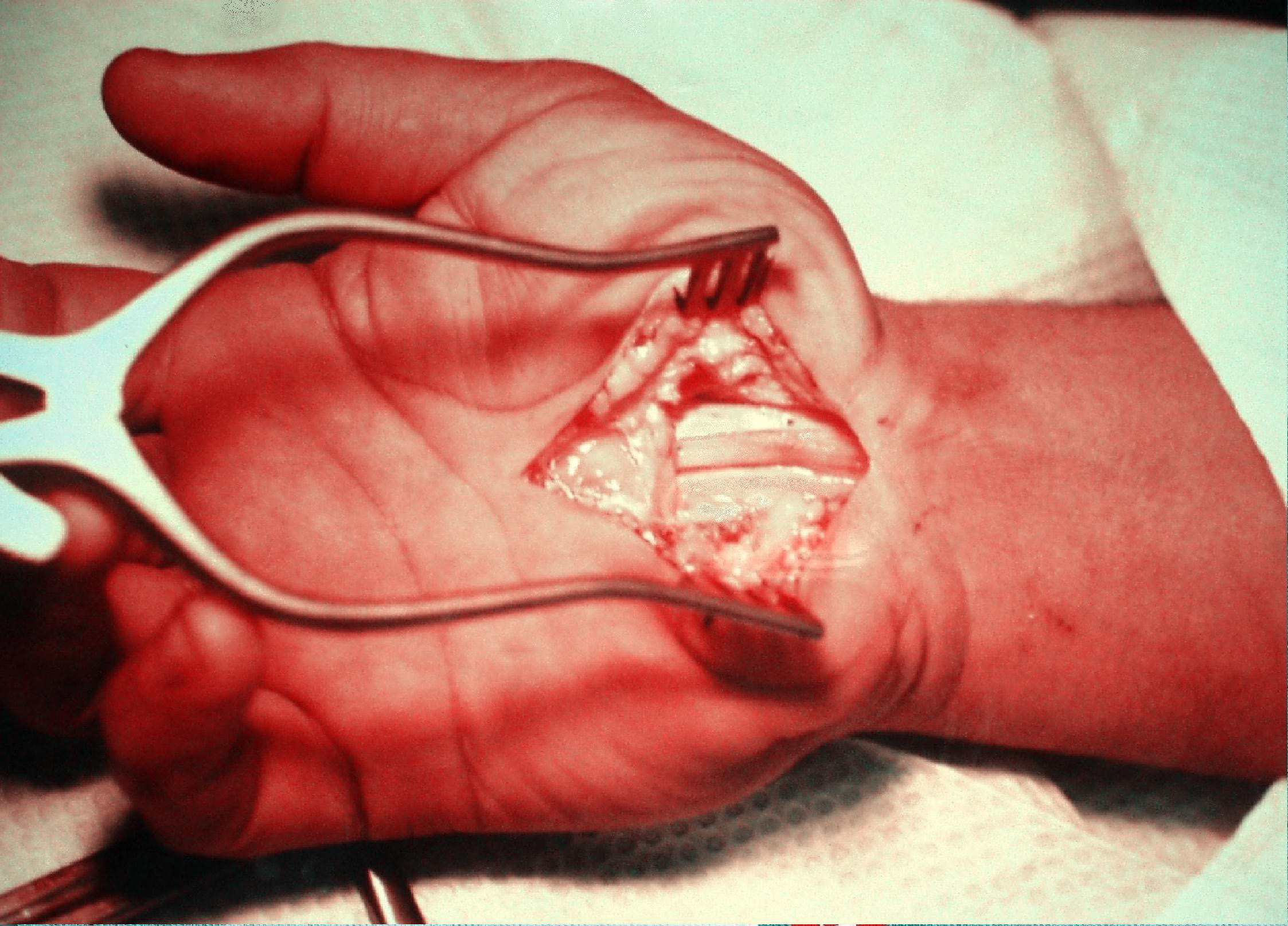
Carpal tunnel syndrome operation

Release of the transverse carpal ligament is undertaken in carpal tunnel surgery. The purpose of cutting the transverse carpal ligament is to relieve pressure on the median nerve, and this is a type of nerve decompression surgery. It is recommended when there is constant (not just intermittent) numbness, muscle weakness, or atrophy, and when night-splinting or other palliative interventions no longer alleviate intermittent symptoms. The surgery may be done with local or regional anesthesia with or without sedation, or under general anesthesia. In general, milder cases can be controlled without surgery for months to years, but severe cases are unrelenting symptomatically and are likely to result in surgical treatment.

=== Physical and occupational therapy ===
There are various techniques used in manual therapy for patients with CTS. Some examples include manual and instrumental soft tissue mobilizations, massage therapy, bone mobilizations or manipulations, and neurodynamic techniques, focused on the skeletal system or soft tissue.

In cases of epineural tethering in the upper extremity, manual therapy can reduce this dysfunction. It can have a positive impact on the gliding of the nerves through the carpal tunnel while moving the elbow, fingers, or wrist. Manual therapy included the incorporation of specified neurodynamic techniques, functional massage, and carpal bone mobilizations. People who receive physical therapy report less pain and an increased functional ability of their wrists and hands.

Self-myofascial ligament stretching has been suggested as an effective technique, although a meta-analysis claimed this form of therapy does not show significant improvement in symptoms or function. However, stretching with a physical therapist can be more beneficial than if the patient stretches alone. Tendon and nerve gliding exercises appear to be useful in carpal tunnel syndrome.

=== Alternative medicine ===
A 2018 Cochrane review on acupuncture and related interventions for the treatment of carpal tunnel syndrome concluded that "Acupuncture and laser acupuncture may have little or no effect in the short term on symptoms of carpal tunnel syndrome (CTS) in comparison with placebo or sham acupuncture." It was also noted that all studies had an unclear or high overall risk of bias and that all evidence was of low or very low quality.

== Prognosis ==
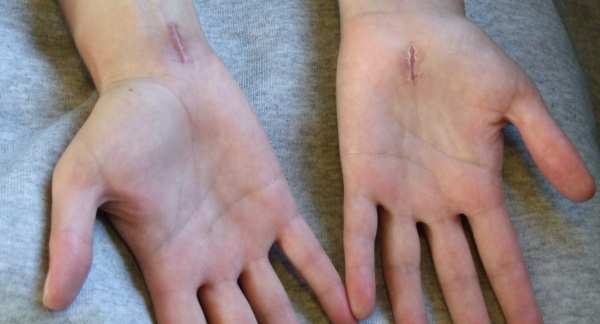
Scars from carpal tunnel release surgery. Two different techniques were used. The left scar is 6 weeks old, the right scar is 2 weeks old.

The natural history of untreated CTS seems to be gradual worsening of the neuropathy. It is difficult to prove that this is always the case, but the supportive evidence is compelling.

Atrophy of the thenar muscles, weakness of palmar abduction, and loss of sensibility (constant numbness as opposed to intermittent paresthesia) are signs of advanced neuropathy. Advanced neuropathy is often permanent. The nerve will try to recover after surgery for more than 2 years, but the recovery may be incomplete.

Paresthesia may increase after the release of advanced carpal tunnel syndrome, and people may feel worse than they did before surgery for many months.

Troublesome recovery seems related to symptoms of anxiety or depression, and unhelpful thoughts about symptoms (such as worst-case or catastrophic thinking), as well as advanced neuropathy with potentially permanent neuropathy.

Recurrence of carpal tunnel syndrome after successful surgery is rare. Caution is warranted in considering additional surgery for people dissatisfied with the result of carpal tunnel release as perceived recurrence may more often be due to renewed awareness of persistent symptoms rather than worsening pathology.

== History ==
CTS was first described around 1850 but was infrequently diagnosed until findings were publicized by neurologist W. Russell Brain in 1947. People were often diagnosed with acroparesthesia. Clinicians would often ascribe it to "poor circulation" and not pursue it further.

Sir James Paget described median nerve compression at the carpal tunnel in two patients after trauma in 1854. The first was due to an injury where a cord had been wrapped around a man's wrist. The second was related to a distal radial fracture. For the first case, Paget performed an amputation of the hand. For the second case, Paget recommended a wrist splint.

The first to notice the association between the carpal ligament pathology and median nerve compression appears to have been Pierre Marie and Charles Foix in 1913. They described the results of a postmortem of an 80-year-old man with bilateral carpal tunnel syndrome. They suggested that division of the carpal ligament would be curative in such cases. Putman had previously described a series of 37 patients and suggested a vasomotor origin. The association between the thenar muscle atrophy and compression was noted in 1914. The name "carpal tunnel syndrome" appears to have been coined by Moersch in 1938.

Physician George S. Phalen of the Cleveland Clinic drew attention to the pathology of compression as the reason for CTS after working with a group of patients in the 1950s and 1960s.

=== Treatment ===
In 1933, Sir James Learmonth outlined a method of nerve decompression of the nerve at the wrist.

This procedure may have been pioneered in Canada by orthopedic surgeon Herbert Galloway in 1924.

Endoscopic release was described in 1988.

== See also ==
- Cheiralgia paresthetica
- Cubital tunnel syndrome
- Radial tunnel syndrome
- Tarsal tunnel syndrome
- Ulnar tunnel syndrome
