= Traumatic neuroma =

Benign nerve-tissue tumor resulting from trauma to a nerve

- Other names: Amputation neuroma or Pseudoneuroma
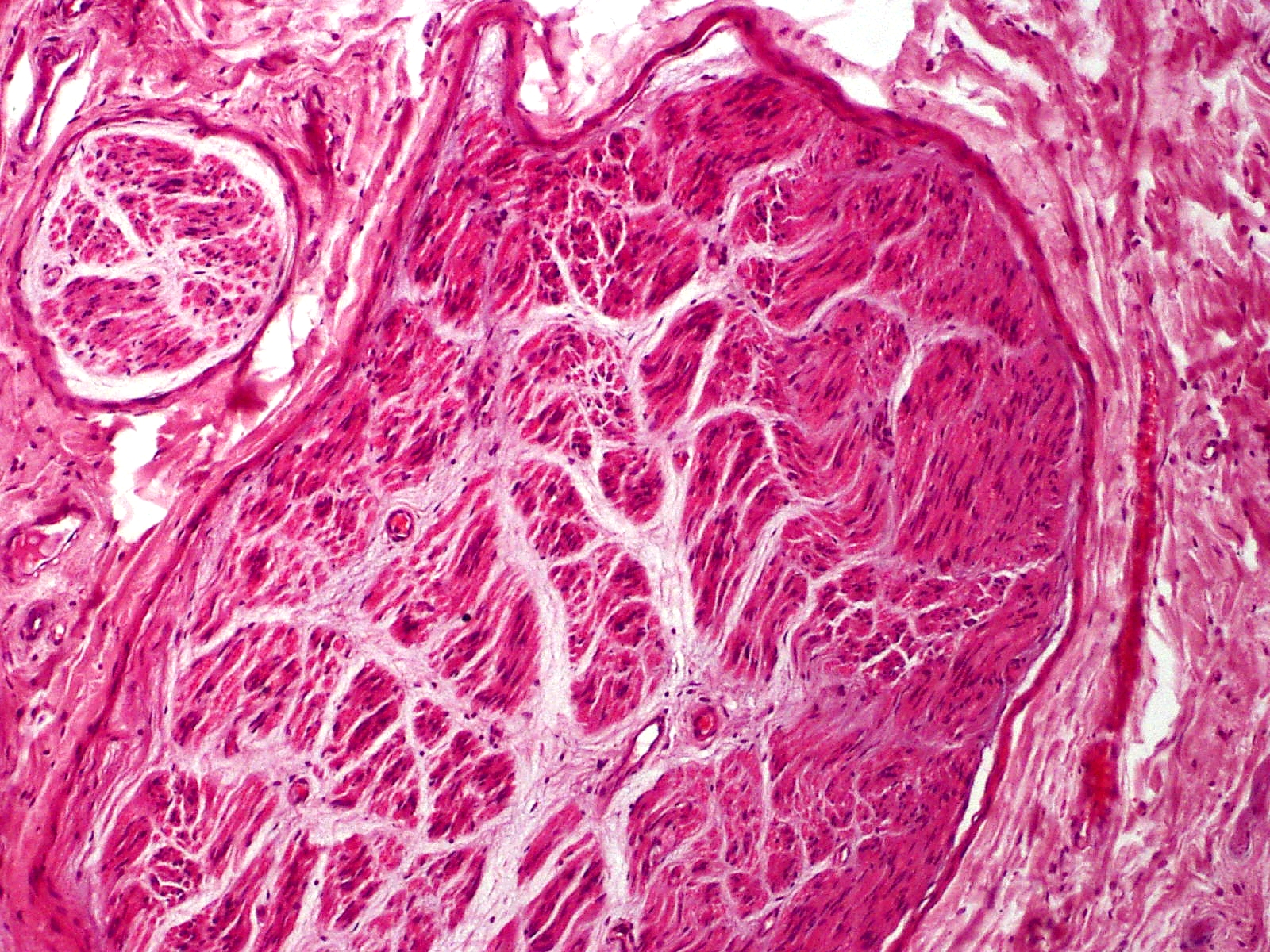
- Specialty: Neurology

A traumatic neuroma is a type of neuroma which results from trauma to a nerve, usually during a surgical procedure. The most common oral locations are on the tongue and near the mental foramen of the mouth. They are relatively rare on the head and neck.

== Pathophysiology ==
An essential step in the formation of a traumatic neuroma is injury to the perineurium. The perineurium directs the growth of axons by acting as a surface that the axons cannot go through. If the perineurium is compromised, the axons may escape into the extraperineural space and arborize in an unregulated fashion.

== Prevention ==
Many surgeries have nerve injury as an unavoidable consequence such as limb amputation, nerve resections, or radical prostatectomy. Consequently, surgical techniques to reduce accidental nerve injury (nerve sparing techniques) and reduce the likelihood to develop traumatic neuromas have been researched. Targeted muscle reinnervation (TMR) is a promising technique used clinically that has significantly improved various benchmarks of quality of life such as pain free patients, residual limb pain, phantom limb pain, opioid use, and ambulation. TMR involves the transfer of proximal nerve stumps to nearby muscle and was originally developed to improve prosthetic control. A newer, related technique is taking a muscle graft and moving it to the divided end of the peripheral nerve, called a regenerative peripheral nerve interface (RPNI). RPNI also significantly reduces the incidence of neuroma formation for amputation.

== See also ==
- List of cutaneous conditions
