= External lamina =

Structure that surrounds the sarcolemma of muscle cells

External lamina is a structure similar to basal lamina that surrounds the sarcolemma of muscle cells. It is secreted by myocytes and consists primarily of Collagen type IV, laminin and perlecan (heparan sulfate proteoglycan). Nerve cells, including perineurial cells and Schwann cells also have an external lamina-like protective coating.

Adipocytes also have an external lamina.
