= Nervous tissue =

Main component of the nervous system

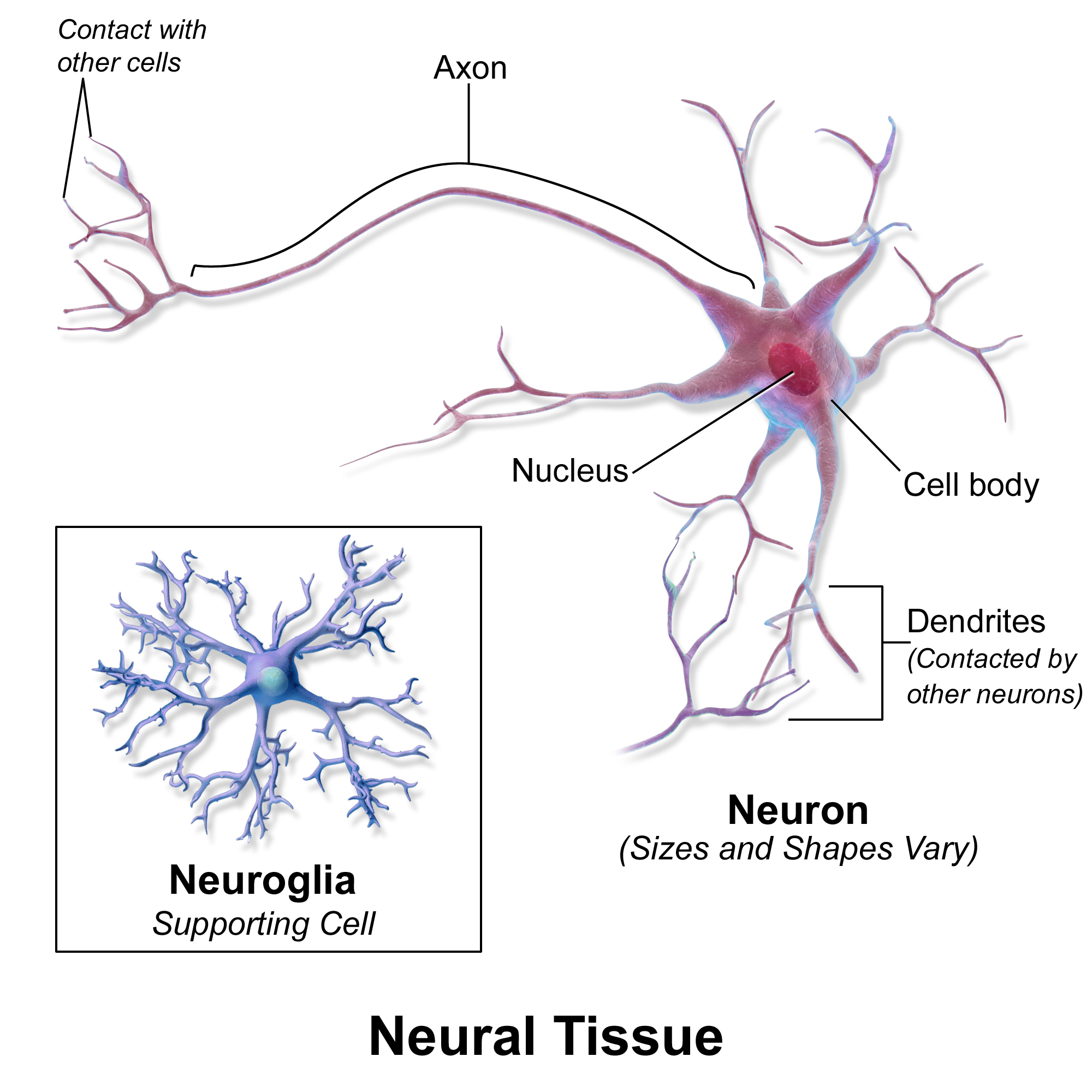
- Cells of nervous tissue

Identifiers
- MeSH: D009417

Nervous tissue, also called neural tissue, is the main tissue component of the nervous system. The nervous system regulates and controls body functions and activity. It consists of two parts: the central nervous system (CNS) comprising the brain and spinal cord, and the peripheral nervous system (PNS) comprising the branching peripheral nerves. It is composed of neurons, also known as nerve cells, which receive and transmit impulses to and from it, and neuroglia, also known as glial cells or glia, which assist the propagation of the nerve impulse as well as provide nutrients to the neurons.

Nervous tissue is made up of different types of neurons, all of which have an axon. An axon is the long stem-like part of the cell that sends action potentials to the next cell. Bundles of axons make up the nerves in the PNS and tracts in the CNS.

Functions of the nervous system are sensory input, integration, control of muscles and glands, homeostasis, and mental activity.

== Structure ==
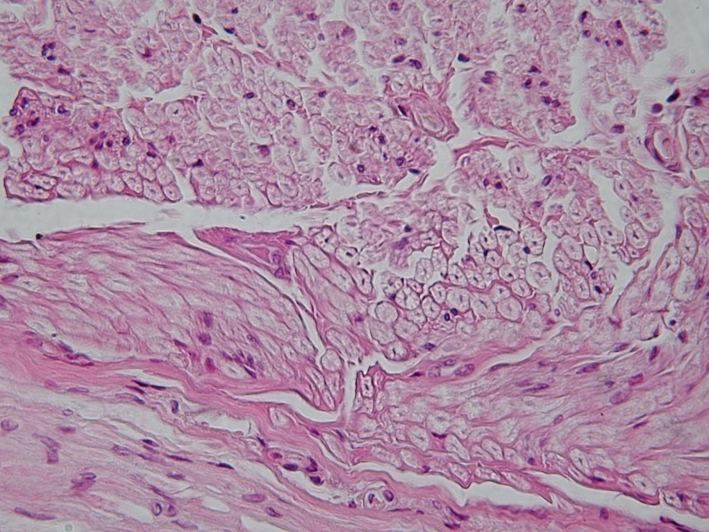
Histologic example of nervous tissue

Nervous tissue is composed of neurons, also called nerve cells, and neuroglial cells. Four types of neuroglia found in the CNS are astrocytes, microglial cells, ependymal cells, and oligodendrocytes. Two types of neuroglia found in the PNS are satellite glial cells and Schwann cells. In the central nervous system (CNS), the tissue types found are grey matter and white matter. The tissue is categorized by its neuronal and neuroglial components.

=== Components ===
Neurons are cells with specialized features that allow them to receive and facilitate nerve impulses, or action potentials, across their membrane to the next neuron. They possess a large cell body (soma), with cell projections called dendrites and an axon. Dendrites are thin, branching projections that receive electrochemical signaling (neurotransmitters) to create a change in voltage in the cell. Axons are long projections that carry the action potential away from the cell body toward the next neuron. The bulb-like end of the axon, called the axon terminal, is separated from the dendrite of the following neuron by a small gap called a synaptic cleft. When the action potential travels to the axon terminal, neurotransmitters are released across the synapse and bind to the post-synaptic receptors, continuing the nerve impulse.

Neurons are classified both functionally and structurally.

Functional classification:

- Sensory neurons (afferent): Relay sensory information in the form of an action potential (nerve impulse) from the PNS to the CNS
- Motor neurons (efferent): Relay an action potential out of the CNS to the proper effector (muscles, glands)
- Interneurons: Cells that form connections between neurons and whose processes are limited to a single local area in the brain or spinal cord

Structural classification:

- Multipolar neurons: Have 3 or more processes coming off the soma (cell body). They are the major neuron type in the CNS and include interneurons and motor neurons.
- Bipolar neurons: Sensory neurons that have two processes coming off the soma, one dendrite and one axon
- Pseudounipolar neurons: Sensory neurons that have one process that splits into two branches, forming the axon and dendrite
- Unipolar brush cells: Are excitatory glutamatergic interneurons that have a single short dendrite terminating in a brush-like tuft of dendrioles. These are found in the granular layer of the cerebellum.

Neuroglia encompasses the non-neural cells in nervous tissue that provide various crucial supportive functions for neurons. They are smaller than neurons, and vary in structure according to their function.

Neuroglial cells are classified as follows:

- Microglial cells: Microglia are macrophage cells that make up the primary immune system for the CNS. They are the smallest neuroglial cell.
- Astrocytes: Star-shaped macroglial cells with many processes found in the CNS. They are the most abundant cell type in the brain, and are intrinsic to a healthy CNS.
- Oligodendrocytes: CNS cells with very few processes. They form myelin sheaths on the axons of a neuron, which are lipid-based insulation that increases the speed at which the action potential, can travel down the axon.
- NG2 glia: CNS cells that are distinct from astrocytes, oligodendrocytes, and microglia. They serve as the developmental precursors of oligodendrocytes.
- Schwann cells: The PNS equivalent of oligodendrocytes, they help maintain axons and form myelin sheaths in the PNS.
- Satellite glial cell: Line the surface of neuron cell bodies in ganglia (groups of nerve body cells bundled or connected together in the PNS)
- Enteric glia: Found in the enteric nervous system, within the gastrointestinal tract.

=== Classification of tissue ===
In the central nervous system:

- Grey matter is composed of cell bodies, dendrites, unmyelinated axons, protoplasmic astrocytes (astrocyte subtype), satellite oligodendrocytes (non-myelinating oligodendrocyte subtype), microglia, and very few myelinated axons.
- White matter is composed of myelinated axons, fibrous astrocytes, myelinating oligodendrocytes, and microglia.

In the peripheral nervous system:

- Ganglion tissue is composed of cell bodies, dendrites, and satellite glial cells.
- Nerves are composed of myelinated and unmyelinated axons, Schwann cells surrounded by connective tissue.

The three layers of connective tissue surrounding each nerve are:

- Endoneurium. Each nerve axon, or fiber is surrounded by the endoneurium, which is also called the endoneurial tube, channel or sheath. This is a thin, delicate, protective layer of connective tissue.
- Perineurium. Each nerve fascicle containing one or more axons, is enclosed by the perineurium, a connective tissue having a lamellar arrangement in seven or eight concentric layers. This plays a very important role in the protection and support of the nerve fibers and also serves to prevent the passage of large molecules from the epineurium into a fascicle.
- Epineurium. The epineurium is the outermost layer of dense connective tissue enclosing the (peripheral) nerve.

== Function ==
Myelinated axons (right) conduct impulses faster than unmyelinated axons.

The function of nervous tissue is to form the communication network of the nervous system by conducting electric signals across tissue. In the CNS, grey matter, which contains the synapses, is important for information processing. White matter, containing myelinated axons, connects and facilitates nerve impulse between grey matter areas in the CNS. In the PNS, the ganglion tissue, containing the cell bodies and dendrites, contain relay points for nerve tissue impulses. The nerve tissue, containing myelinated axons bundles, carry action potential nerve impulses.

== Clinical significance ==
=== Tumours ===
Neoplasms (tumours) in nervous tissue include:

- Gliomas (glial cell tumors)

Oligoastrocytoma, Choroid plexus papilloma, Ependymoma, Astrocytoma (Pilocytic astrocytoma, Glioblastoma multiforme), Dysembryoplastic neuroepithelial tumour, Oligodendroglioma, Medulloblastoma, Primitive neuroectodermal tumor

- Neuroepitheliomatous tumors

Ganglioneuroma, Neuroblastoma, Atypical teratoid rhabdoid tumor, Retinoblastoma, Esthesioneuroblastoma

- Nerve sheath tumors

Neurofibroma (Neurofibrosarcoma, Neurofibromatosis), Schwannoma, Neurinoma, Acoustic neuroma, Neuroma
