= George S. Phalen =

American physician

George S. Phalen (2 December 1911 in Peoria, Illinois – 14 April 1998 in Dallas) was an American hand surgeon remembered for his work on carpal tunnel syndrome including his description of Phalen's maneuver.

== Biography ==
George Phalen graduated from Bradley University in 1932 and gained his M.D. from Northwestern University in 1937. He undertook his residency at the Mayo Clinic before joining the Army in 1942. He was a Lieutenant Colonel and chief of orthopedic surgery at the O'Reilly General Hospital in Springfield, Missouri, an Army hand center, and then chief of hand surgery at the William Beaumont Army Medical Center. After the Second World War he worked at the Cleveland Clinic, becoming chief of hand surgery. He helped to form the American Society for Surgery of the Hand in 1946 and was president during the 1960s. He was also president of the Association of Bone and Joint Surgeons in 1965. He moved to the Dallas Medical and Surgical Clinic in 1970, remaining there until his retirement in 1980.

He described the carpal tunnel syndrome in 1950, and although it had been described previously by James Paget in 1854 and James Jackson Putman in 1880, amongst others, Phalen improved the understanding of the aetiology of the condition with his experience of several hundred patients during the 1950s and 1960s.
