= Epineurium =

Outermost layer of a nerve

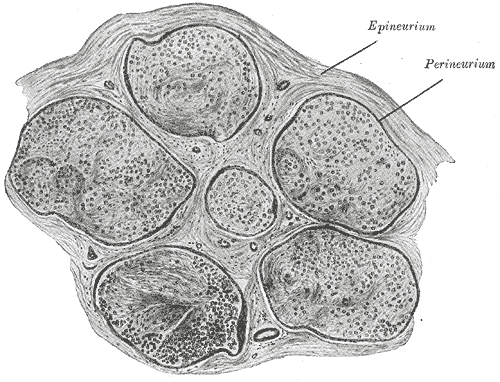
- Transverse section of human tibial nerve. (Epineurium labeled at upper right.)

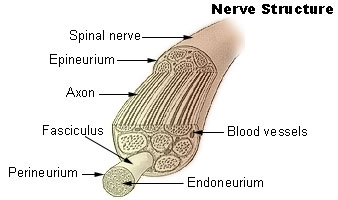
- Nerve structure

Details

Identifiers
- Latin: Epineurium
- TA98: A14.2.00.016
- TA2: 6155
- FMA: 12234

The epineurium is the outermost layer of dense irregular connective tissue surrounding a peripheral nerve. It usually surrounds multiple nerve fascicles as well as blood vessels which supply the nerve. Smaller branches of these blood vessels penetrate into the perineurium. In addition to blood vessels which supply the nerve, lymphocytes and fibroblasts are also present and contribute to the production of collagen fibers that form the backbone of the epineurium. In addition to providing structural support, lymphocytes and fibroblasts also play a vital role in maintenance and repair of the surrounding tissues.

When the spinal nerve leaves the vertebral canal via an intervertebral foramen, two layers of the spinal meninges, the arachnoid and the dura invaginate the nerve to form a dural sleeve of connective tissue, which is the epineurium. The outer portion of this sleeve comprises the external epineurium which permits longitudinal nerve excursion and absorption of longitudinal stress. The layer of the epineurium that extends within the nerve to define the fascicles is termed the internal epineurium. Together, these two layers form the epineurium, which varies in thickness along the course of a nerve. The epineurium is usually most abundant around joints, as its function is to protect the nerves from stretching and subsequent injury. Epineurium is primarily made from collagen.

== Clinical significance ==
A common surgical procedure to repair a torn nerve via the epineurium is termed an epineurial repair.

Schwannomas often remain completely encapsulated by the epineurium as they grow.

Epineurial barriers can be used to limit the formation of neuromas after neurotmesis. The epineurium is an effective barrier against axon growth.

== See also ==
- Connective tissue in the peripheral nervous system
- Endoneurium
- Epimysium, a similar type of connective tissue which surrounds muscles
