= Peripheral nerve interface =

Implant for connecting devices to nerves

A peripheral nerve interface is the bridge between the peripheral nervous system and a computer interface which serves as a bi‐directional information transducer recording and sending signals between the human body and a machine processor. Interfaces to the nervous system usually take the form of electrodes for stimulation and recording, though chemical stimulation and sensing are possible. Research in this area is focused on developing peripheral nerve interfaces for the restoration of function following disease or injury to minimize associated losses. Peripheral nerve interfaces also enable electrical stimulation and recording of the peripheral nervous system to study the form and function of the peripheral nervous system. For example, recent animal studies have demonstrated high accuracy in tracking physiological meaningful measures, like joint angle. Many researchers also focus in the area of neuroprosthesis, linking the human nervous system to bionics in order to mimic natural sensorimotor control and function. Successful implantation of peripheral nerve interfaces depend on a number of factors which include appropriate indication, perioperative testing, differentiated planning, and functional training. Typically microelectrode devices are implanted adjacent to, around or within the nerve trunk to establish contact with the peripheral nervous system. Different approaches may be used depending on the type of signal desired and attainable.

== Function ==
The primary purpose of a neural interface is to enable two-way exchange of information with the nervous system for a sustained period of time to enable effective and high density stimulation and recording. The peripheral nervous system (PNS) is responsible for relaying information from the brain and spinal cord to the extremities of the body and back. The function of a peripheral nerve interface is to assist the nervous system when peripheral nerve function is compromised. To supplement the roles of the nervous system, interfaces need to augment motor function as well as discern sensory information. The feasibility of peripheral nerve stimulation to achieve a desired motor output has been demonstrated and is one of the major driving forces for this area of research. Information throughout the nervous system is exchanged primarily through action potentials. These signals occur at varying numbers and intervals dependent on both the neuroanatomical and neurochemical make up of the individual and localized region. Information may be either introduced or read out by inducing or recovering action potentials from the body. Successful development and implementation of a peripheral nerve interface would allow for both the introduction of information to the nervous system, and extraction of information from the nervous system.

== Problems and limitations ==
Problems and limitations in peripheral nerve interfacing are both biophysical and biological in nature. These challenges include:

- Fidelity of the interface in terms of functional resolution
- Relatively weak, noise-ridden electrical signals causing a challenging interface design constraint
- Interface implantation-associated injury to nerve fibers of interest
- Stability of the interface over time due to inflammation
- Managing inadvertent consequences such as pain or false sensory/motor stimulation due to physical movement or inflammation-associated triggering of neural activity

== Application ==
Peripheral nerve interfaces are used for pain modulation, restoration of motor function following spinal cord injury or stroke, treatment of epilepsy by electrical stimulation of the vagus nerve, nerve stimulation to control micturition, occipital nerve stimulation for chronic migraines and to interface with neuroprosthetics.

== Types ==
A wide variety of electrode designs have been researched, tested, and manufactured. These electrodes lie on a spectrum varying in degrees of invasiveness. Research in this area seeks to address issues centered around peripheral nerve/tissue damage, access to efferent and afferent signals, and selective recording/stimulation of nerve tissue. Ideally peripheral nerve interfaces are optimally designed to interface with biological constraints of peripheral nerve fibers, match the mechanical and electrical properties of the surrounding tissue, biocompatible with minimal immune response, high sensor resolution, are minimally invasive, and chronically stable with low signal-to-noise ratios. Strongest signals are recorded from nodes of ranvier. Peripheral nerve interfaces may be divided into extraneural and intrafascular categories.

=== Epineurial electrode interface ===
Epineurial electrodes are fabricated as longitudinal strips holding two or more contact sites to interface with peripheral nerves. These electrodes are placed on the nerve and secured by suturing to the epineurium. The suturing process requires delicate surgery and can be torn from the nerve if excessive motion creates tension. Since the electrode is sutured to the epineurium it is unlikely to damage the nerve trunk.

=== Helicoidal electrode interface ===
Helicoidal electrodes are placed circumjacent to the nerve and are made of flexible platinum ribbon in a helical design. This design allows the electrode to conform to the size and shape of the nerve in attempts to minimize mechanical trauma. The structural design causes low selectivity. Helicoidal electrodes are currently used for FES stimulation of the vagus nerve to control intractable epilepsy, sleep apnea, and to treat depressive syndromes.

=== Book electrode interface ===
The book electrode consists of a silicone rubber block with slots. Each slot contains three platinum foils which function as electrodes, anode electrodes and one cathode. The spinal roots of the nerve are placed into these slots and the slots are then covered with a flap made of silicone and fixed with silicone glue. This electrode is mostly used to interrupt reflex circuits of the dorsal sacral roots and to control bladder function. Book electrodes are still considered very bulky.
