= Neuroma =

Benign tumor composed of nerve tissue

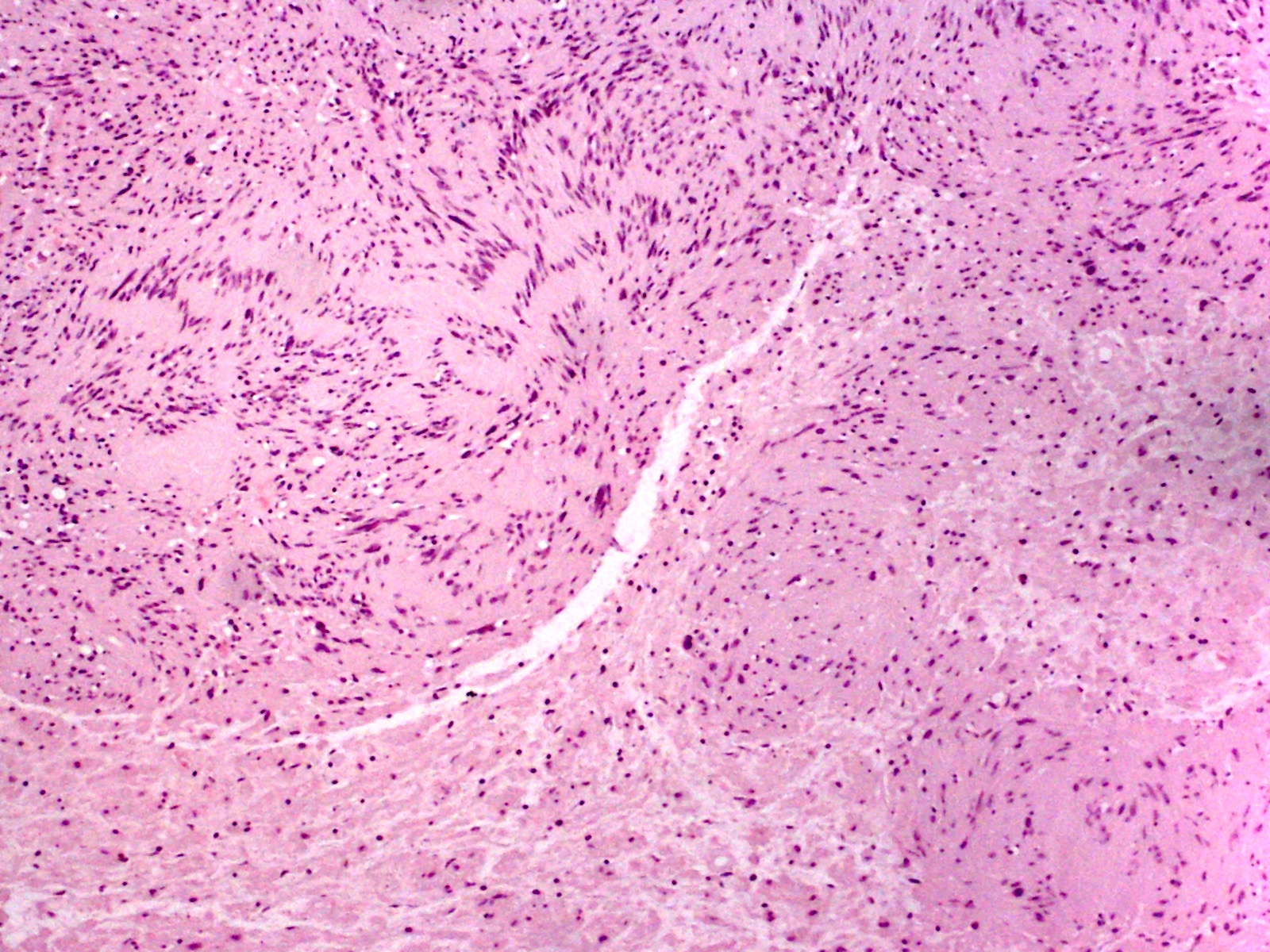
- Solitary circumscribed neuroma
- Specialty: Oncology

A neuroma (/njʊəˈroʊmə/; plural: neuromata or neuromas) is a growth or tumor of nerve tissue. Neuromas tend to be benign, not cancerous, and many nerve tumors, including those that are commonly malignant, are nowadays referred to by other terms.

Neuromas can arise from different types of nervous tissue, including the nerve fibers and their myelin sheath, as in the case of genuine neoplasms (growths) like ganglioneuromas and neurinomas.

The term is also used to refer to any swelling of a nerve, even in the absence of abnormal cell growth. In particular, traumatic neuroma results from trauma to a nerve, often during a surgical procedure. Morton's neuroma affects the foot. Neuromas can be painful, or sometimes, as in the case of acoustic neuromas, can give rise to other symptoms.

== Neoplasms ==
- Acoustic neuroma - a slow-growing, benign tumor of the acoustic nerve. Symptoms, which most often start after the age of 30, can include dizziness, headache, vertigo, loss of balance, ringing sensations, and numbness.
- Ganglioneuroma - a tumor of the sympathetic nerve fibers arising from neural crest cells.
- Pacinian neuroma - a very rare, painful, benign hyperplastic tumor of Pacinian corpuscles (mechanoreceptors responsible for sensitivity to vibration and pressure), sometimes linked to a history of local trauma.

== Other nerve swellings ==
Some of the benign varieties of neuroma, in the broadest sense of the term, are not neoplasms.

- Traumatic neuroma follows different forms of nerve injury (often as a result of surgery). They occur at the end of injured nerve fibres as a form of ineffective, unregulated nerve regeneration; it occurs most commonly near a scar, either superficially (skin, subcutaneous fat) or deep (e.g., after a cholecystectomy). They are often very painful. Synonyms include scar neuroma, amputation neuroma, or pseudoneuroma.
- Morton's neuroma (a mononeuropathy of the foot) is another example of the more general usage of the term neuroma. Some prefer the term "Morton's metatarsalgia", thus avoiding the term neuroma and its association with tumors.

== Etymology ==
The stem neuro- originates from the Greek word for nerve (νεῦρον), while the suffix -oma (-ωμα) denotes swelling. The stem does not imply that neuromas necessarily arise from neurons; neuromas generally arise from non-neuronal nerve tissues. The word was originally used to refer to any nerve tumor, but its meaning has evolved.
