= Endoneurium =

Connective tissue layer around myelinated nerve fibers in peripheral nervous system

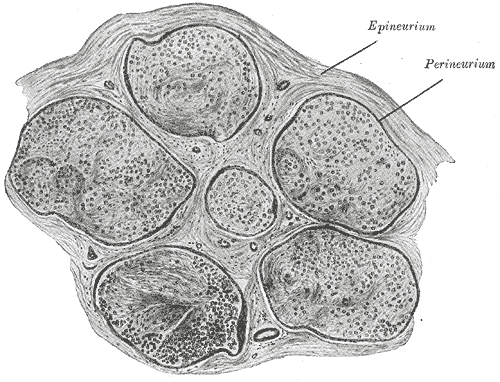
- Transverse section of human tibial nerve.

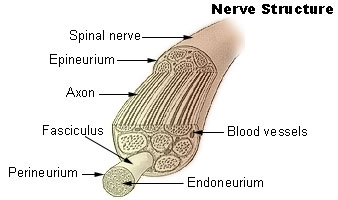
- Nerve structure

Details
- Part of: myelin sheath of nerves
- System: Nervous system

Identifiers
- TA98: A14.2.00.014
- TA2: 6158
- FMA: 52586

The endoneurium (also called endoneurial channel, endoneurial sheath, endoneurial tube, or Henle's sheath) is a layer of delicate connective tissue around the myelin sheath of each myelinated nerve fiber in the peripheral nervous system. Its component cells are called endoneurial cells. The endoneuria with their enclosed nerve fibers are bundled into groups called nerve fascicles, each fascicle within its own protective sheath called a perineurium. If sufficiently large, nerves containing multiple fascicles, each with its blood supply and fatty tissue, may be bundled within yet another sheath, the epineurium.

The endoneurium contains a liquid known as endoneurial fluid, which contains little protein. In the peripheral nervous system the endoneurial fluid is notionally equivalent to cerebrospinal fluid in the central nervous system. Peripheral nerve injuries commonly release increased amounts of endoneurial fluid into surrounding tissues; these can be detected by magnetic resonance neurography, thereby assisting in locating injuries to peripheral nerves.

The endoneurium runs longitudinally along the nerve fiber, but with discontinuities where septa pass inward from the innermost layer of the perineurium. It contains fine bundles of fibrous connective tissue, primarily collagen, embedded in a matrix of ground substance. This structure serves to support capillary blood vessels, arranged so as to form a network of elongated meshes. Similar structures occur around some nervous components elsewhere in the body, for example around the Schwann cells on the peripheral side of the transitional zone on the auditory nerve.

== See also ==
- Connective tissue in the peripheral nervous system
