= Nerve fascicle =

Bundle of funiculi (small bundles of axons) in the peripheral nervous system

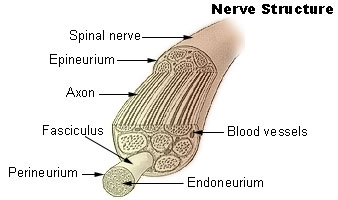
- Nerve structure

Identifiers
- TA98: A14.1.00.012
- TA2: 6157
- FMA: 12235

A nerve fascicle is a bundle of nerve fibers belonging to a nerve in the peripheral nervous system. A nerve fascicle is also called a fasciculus. In the central nervous system, the analogous structures are known as nerve tracts.

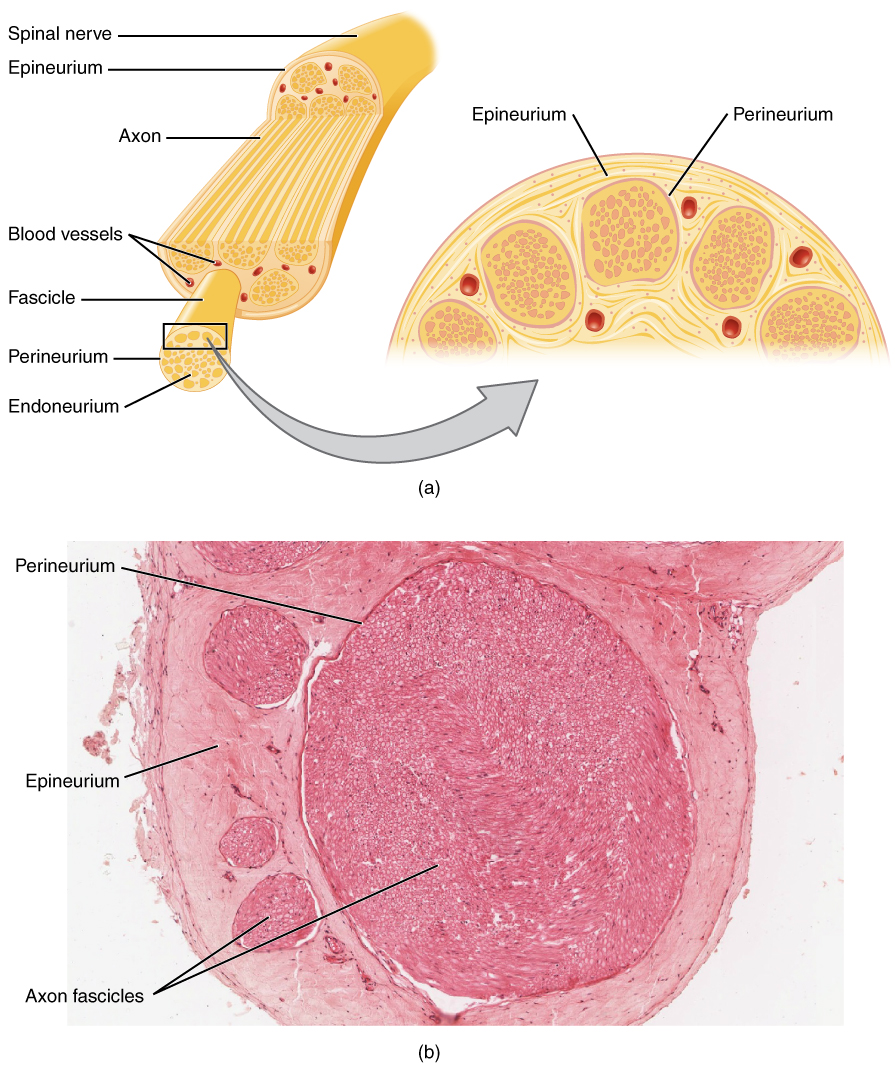
Nerve fascicles constitute both groups of nerves that make up the peripheral nervous system - cranial nerves (though olfactory and optic nerves are not considered part of PNS) and spinal nerves (which connect to spinal cord)

A nerve fascicle is enclosed by perineurium, a layer of fascial connective tissue. Each nerve fiber in the nerve fascicle is also enclosed by a connective tissue layer of endoneurium. Bundles of nerve fascicles are called fasciculi and are constituents of the nerve trunk of a nerve. A main nerve trunk may contain a great many fascicles enclosing many thousands of axons (or nerve fibers).

In neuroanatomy, different tracts in the spinal cord are bundled into fasciculi such as the medial longitudinal fasciculus. In the spinal cord, fasciculi are bundled into columns called funiculi such as the anterior funiculus.

== See also ==
- Epineurium
- Nervous tissue
- Funiculus (neuroanatomy)
