= Perineurium =

Sheath around nerve fasciculi

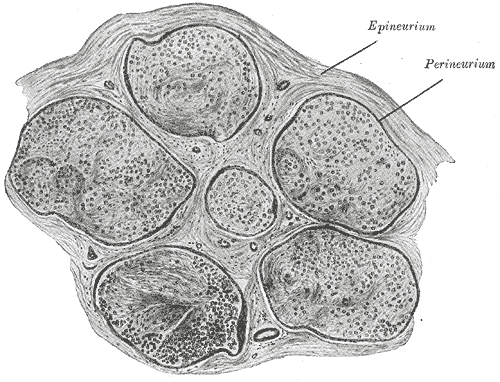
- Transverse section of human tibial nerve (perineurium labeled at upper right)

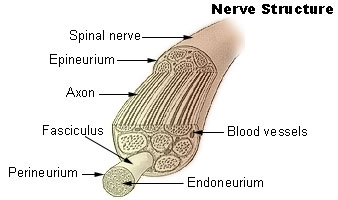
- Nerve structure

Identifiers
- TA98: A14.2.00.015
- TA2: 6156
- FMA: 52585

The perineurium is a protective sheath that surrounds a nerve fascicle. This layer bundles together the axons targeting the same anatomical location. The perineurium is composed of fibroblasts.

In the peripheral nervous system, the myelin sheath of each axon in a nerve is wrapped in a delicate protective sheath known as the endoneurium. Fascicles, bundles of neurons, are surrounded by the perineurium. Several fascicles may be in turn bundled along with blood supply and fatty tissue within yet another sheath, the epineurium. This grouping structure is analogous to the muscular organization system of epimysium, perimysium and endomysium.

== Structure ==
The perineurium is composed of connective tissue, which has a distinctly lamellar arrangement consisting of one to several concentric layers. The perineurium is composed of perineurial cells, which are epithelioid myofibroblasts. Perineurial cells are sometimes referred to as myoepithelioid due to their epithelioid and myofibroblastoid properties including tight junctions, gap junctions, external laminae and contractility. The tight junctions provide a selective barrier to chemical substances.

The perineurium is a smooth, transparent tubular membrane which may be easily separated from the fibers it encloses. In contrast, the epineurium is a tough and mechanically resistant tissue which is not easily penetrated by a needle.

== Clinical importance ==
The perineurium, as the epineurium, has a clinical importance following a trauma, like a fracture. A sort of lesion called axonotmesis can happen, where the axon of the nerve is damaged while the integrity of the perineurium and epineurium is preserved. In that case, there will be a loss of neural transmission which will be causing a diminished response in the distal part of the nerve. The axon will be able to regenerate itself at a rate of 3 cm per month, generally indicating a return to a physiological state in roughly three months.

== See also ==
- Connective tissue in the peripheral nervous system
- Wallerian degeneration
- Perimysium
