= Neuralgia =

Pain disorder characterized by pain in the distribution of a nerve or nerves

- Specialty: Neurology

Neuralgia (Greek neuron, "nerve" + algos, "pain") is pain in the distribution of a nerve or nerves, as in intercostal neuralgia, trigeminal neuralgia, and glossopharyngeal neuralgia.

== Classification ==
Under the general heading of neuralgia are trigeminal neuralgia (TN), atypical trigeminal neuralgia (ATN), occipital neuralgia, glossopharyngeal neuralgia and postherpetic neuralgia (caused by shingles or herpes). The term neuralgia is also used to refer to pain associated with sciatica and brachial plexopathy.

=== Atypical (trigeminal) ===
Atypical trigeminal neuralgia (ATN) is a rare form of neuralgia and may also be the most misdiagnosed form. The symptoms can be mistaken for migraines, dental problems such as temporomandibular joint disorder, musculoskeletal issues, and hypochondriasis. ATN can have a wide range of symptoms and the pain can fluctuate in intensity from mild aching to a crushing or burning sensation, and also to the extreme pain experienced with the more common trigeminal neuralgia. ATN pain can be described as heavy, aching, and burning. Affected individuals have a constant migraine-like headache and experience pain in all three trigeminal nerve branches. This includes aching teeth, ear aches, feeling of fullness in sinuses, cheek pain, pain in forehead and temples, jaw pain, pain around eyes, and occasional electric shock-like stabs. Unlike typical neuralgia, this form can also cause pain in the back of the scalp and neck. Pain tends to worsen with talking, facial expressions, chewing, and certain sensations such as a cool breeze. Vascular compression of the trigeminal nerve, infections of the teeth or sinuses, physical trauma, or past viral infections are possible causes of ATN.

In the case of trigeminal neuralgia, the affected nerves are responsible for sensing touch, temperature sensation and pressure sensation in the facial area from the jaw to the forehead. The disorder generally causes short episodes of excruciating pain, usually for less than two minutes and usually only one side of the face. The pain can be described in a variety of ways such as "stabbing", "sharp", "like lightning", "burning", and even "itchy". In the atypical form of TN, the pain presents as severe constant aching along the nerve. The pain associated with TN is recognized as one of the most excruciating pains that can be experienced.

Simple stimuli—such as eating, talking, making facial expressions, washing the face, or any light touch or sensation—can trigger an attack (even the sensation of a cool breeze). Attacks may be lone occurrences, clusters of attacks, or constant episodes. Some patients experience muscle spasm, which led to the original term for TN of "tic douloureux" ("tic", meaning "spasm", and "douloureux", meaning "painful", in French).

=== Glossopharyngeal ===
Glossopharyngeal neuralgia consists of recurring attacks of severe pain in the back of the throat, the area near the tonsils, the back of the tongue, and part of the ear. The pain is due to malfunction of the glossopharyngeal nerve (CN IX), which moves the muscles of the throat and carries information from the throat, tonsils, and tongue to the brain.

Glossopharyngeal neuralgia, a rare disorder, usually begins after age 40 and occurs more often in men. Often, its cause is unknown. However, glossopharyngeal neuralgia sometimes results from an abnormally positioned artery that compresses the glossopharyngeal nerve near where it exits the brain stem. Rarely, the cause is a tumor in the brain or neck.

=== Occipital ===
Occipital neuralgia, also known as C2 neuralgia, or Arnold's neuralgia, is a medical condition characterized by chronic pain in the upper neck, back of the head and behind the eyes.

== Mechanisms ==
By understanding the neuroplastic changes following nerve damage, researchers may be able to gain a better understanding of the mechanism of hyperexcitability in the nervous system that is believed to cause neuropathic pain.

=== Peripheral nerve injury ===
A neuron's response to trauma can often be determined by the severity of the injury, classified by Seddon's classification. In Seddon's Classification, nerve injury is described as either neurapraxia, axonotmesis, or neurotmesis. Following trauma to the nerve, a short onset of afferent impulses, termed "injury discharge", occurs. This occurrence lasts only minutes, but has been linked to the onset of neuropathic pain.

When an axon is severed, the segment of the axon distal to the cut degenerates and is absorbed by Schwann cells. The proximal segment fuses, retracts, and swells, forming a "retraction bulb". The synaptic terminal function is lost, as axoplasmic transport ceases and no neurotransmitters are created. The nucleus of the damaged axon undergoes chromatolysis in preparation for axon regeneration. Schwann cells in the distal stump of the nerve and basal lamina components secreted by Schwann cells guide and help stimulate regeneration. The regenerating axon must connect to the appropriate receptors to make an effective regeneration. If proper connections to the appropriate receptors are not established, aberrant reinnervation may occur. If the regenerating axon is halted by damaged tissue, neurofibrils may create a mass known as a neuroma.

If an injured neuron degenerates or does not regenerate properly, then the neuron loses its function or may not function properly. Neuron trauma is not an isolated event and may cause degenerative changes in surrounding neurons. When one or more neurons lose their function or begin to malfunction, abnormal signals sent to the brain may be translated as painful signals.

== Diagnosis ==
When assessing neuralgia to find the underlying mechanism, a history of the pain, description of pain, physical examination, and experimental examination are required. Pain is subjective to the patient, but pain assessment questionnaires, such as the McGill Pain Questionnaire can be useful for evaluation. Physical examinations usually involve testing responses to stimuli such as touch, temperature, and vibration. Neuralgia can be further classified by the type of stimuli that elicits a response: mechanical, thermal, or chemical. Response to the course of treatment is the final tool used to determine the mechanism of the pain. Additional tools may be used, predominantly in research settings including Laser Evoked Potentials and Quantitative Sensory testing.

=== Laser evoked potentials ===
Laser evoked potentials (LEPs) are measurements of cortical responses using lasers to selectively stimulate thermonociceptors in the skin. Lasers can emit a radiant-heat pulse stimulus to selectively activate A-delta and C free nerve endings. LEP abnormalities may be indicative of neuropathic pain, while a normal LEP is often more ambiguous. LEPs can assess damage to both central and peripheral nervous systems.

=== Quantitative sensory testing ===
Another method for testing the proper function of a nerve is Quantitative sensory testing (QST). QST relies on analysis of a patient's response to external stimuli of controlled intensity. A stimulus is applied to the skin of the nerve area being tested in ascending and descending orders of magnitude. Clinicians can quantify the mechanical sensitivity of the tactile stimulus using von Frey hairs or Semmes-Weinstein monofilaments (SWMFs). Also, weighted needles can be used to measure pin-prick sensation, and an electronic vibrameter is used to measure vibration sensitivity. Thermal stimuli are quantified by using a probe that operates on the Peltier principle.

== Treatment ==
Treatment options include medicines and surgery.

Neuralgia is more difficult to treat than other types of pain because it does not respond well to normal pain medications. Special medications have become more specific to neuralgia and typically fall under the category of membrane stabilizing drugs or antidepressants such as duloxetine (Cymbalta). The antiepileptic medication pregabalin (Lyrica) was developed specifically for neuralgia and other neuropathic pain as a successor to gabapentin (Neurontin).

High doses of anticonvulsant medicines—used to block nerve firing— and tricyclic antidepressants are generally effective in treating neuralgia. If medication fails to relieve pain or produces intolerable side effects, surgical treatment may be recommended.

Neural augmentative surgeries are used to stimulate the affected nerve. By stimulating the nerve the brain can be "fooled" into thinking it is receiving normal input. Electrodes are carefully placed in the dorsal root and subcutaneous nerve stimulation is used to stimulate the targeted nerve pathway. A technician can create different electrical distributions in the nerve to optimize the efficiency, and a patient controls the stimulation by passing a magnet over the unit.

Some degree of facial numbness is expected after most of these surgical procedures, and neuralgia might return despite the procedure's initial success. Depending on the procedure, other surgical risks include hearing loss, balance problems, infection, and stroke. These surgeries include rhizotomy (where select nerve fibers are destroyed to block pain) and microvascular decompression (where the surgeon moves the vessels that are compressing the nerve away from it and places a soft cushion between the nerve and the vessels).

== History ==
The earliest cited instance of the term is the French, névralgie, which, according to Rowland, was coined by François Chaussier in his 1801 Table Synoptique de la Névralgie, for "...an affection of one or more nerves causing pain which is usually of an intermittent but frequently intense character". The features and assumed etiology found in the medical literature have varied significantly over time.

Various locations were proposed for the primary lesion during the nineteenth century, including nerve roots, ganglia, trunks and branches, as well as the brain and spinal cord. In 1828, JC Warren and TJ Graham placed the cause in the trunk or branch of the nerve innervating the perceived site of the pain, though Graham also attributed neuralgia to "morbid sensibility of the nervous system" due to "great disorder of the general health". Teale in 1830 and many after him argued that it may be located in the spinal cord or nerve root. Later in the century some proposed it may be an affliction of organs such as the uterus or liver, while others classed certain headaches as neuralgias, and proposed that emotional distress may promote the condition.

== Society and culture ==
- In R. C. Sherriff's play Journey's End, the character Hibbert lies about having neuralgia to his commanding officer, and demands to be sent home.
- In Marcel Proust's Swann's Way, the father of the narrator has neuralgia.
- In the 1976 film Aces High (based on "Journey's End"), a British pilot in the Royal Flying Corps (played by Simon Ward) feigns neuralgia to escape the terrors of aerial combat.
- The narrator of Vladimir Nabokov's novel Look at the Harlequins! claims to have neuralgia of the jaw.

== See also ==
- Cranial nerves
- Nerve
- Neuritis
- Neuropathic pain
- Neuropathy
