= Herbert Seddon =

English surgeon (1903–1977)

Sir Herbert Seddon CMG FRCS
- Born: Herbert John Seddon; 13 July 1903; Derby, Derbyshire, England
- Died: 21 December 1977 (aged 74); London
- Education: William Hulme's Grammar School; St Bartholomew's Hospital Medical College
- Occupation: Professor of Orthopaedic Surgery
- Known for: Research into poliomyelitis Research into peripheral nerve injury Orthopaedic teaching and training
- Medical career
- Institutions: University of Oxford; University of London; Institute of Orthopaedics, London
- Notable works: The surgical disorders of the peripheral nerves

Sir Herbert John Seddon CMG FRCS (13 July 1903 – 21 December 1977) was an English orthopaedic surgeon. He was Nuffield Professor of Orthopaedic Surgery at the University of Oxford, where his work and publications on peripheral nerve injuries gained him an international reputation. His classification of nerve injuries forms the basis of that in use into the 21st century. He went on to become director of the new Institute of Orthopaedics in London and subsequently the first Professor of Orthopaedics in the University of London. In this role he directed basic science research into orthopaedic conditions and developed postgraduate training in orthopaedic surgery. He was President of the British Orthopaedic Association, and was knighted in 1964 for services to orthopaedics.

== Early life and surgical training ==
Herbert Seddon was born in Derby, the son of John Seddon, and his wife Ellen Seddon (née Thornton). He grew up in Manchester and went to school at William Hulme's Grammar School. He went on to study medicine at St Bartholomew's Hospital Medical College, London, graduating MB, BS in 1928 with honours and winning the University Gold Medal. He was appointed house surgeon at St Bartholomew's Hospital to Sir Holburt Waring, who, like Seddon, had grown up in Lancashire. He was then house surgeon to Reginald Elmslie, who had been one of the first surgeons in Britain to specialise in orthopaedic surgery. Seddon then took up a surgical post at the University of Michigan at Ann Arbor in 1930 and the following year he became surgeon in residence at the Royal National Orthopaedic Hospital (RNOH) at Stanmore, Middlesex.

== Surgical career ==
In January 1940 Seddon was appointed to the Nuffield Chair of Orthopaedic Surgery at the University of Oxford. He was given the degree of Doctor of Medicine (DM) and Master of Arts from the University of Oxford on appointment to the chair. In addition he became a professorial fellow of Worcester College, Oxford and for clinical duties he became clinical director at the Wingfield-Morris Hospital, later renamed the Nuffield Orthopaedic Centre (NOC) and subsequently part of Oxford University Hospitals NHS Trust. The war years were to prove difficult for him personally as his family remained in the United States for the duration of the Second World War.

=== Poliomyelitis ===
During his nine years at the Royal National Orthopaedic Hospital (1931–1940) he cared for children with poliomyelitis. Because of his experience in the treatment of polio he was asked by the British government to travel to Malta to advise on the management of an epidemic of this infection in Malta and he travelled there on three occasions between 1943–1945. He was also asked by the Governor of Mauritius to advise on an outbreak there. In addition to treating patients, he advised on physiotherapy services, arranged splint workshops and made suggestions about the rehabilitation for those left disabled by the disease. Among his practical contributions to management of the condition was the development of splints for the condition, and his 1947 paper on the subject came to be regarded as a leading work on the topic and was widely followed.

=== Tuberculosis of the spinal column ===
At Stanmore, he researched Pott's disease, caused by tuberculosis of the vertebrae, and its complications including spinal deformity and spinal cord compression. He clarified the pathogenesis of paraplegia in Pott's disease, demonstrating that it was not always caused by the kyphosis, but in the early stages was caused by the intervertebral abscess pressing back against the spinal cord. This led to the appreciation that the cause of the paraplegia was reversible, if diagnosed and treated early. This transformed the outlook of many patients who developed early, acute paraplegia from this cause. He also developed workshops for patients with orthopaedic disability, which taught them new skills and new trades.

=== Peripheral nerve injury ===
During his Oxford years he continued the work on peripheral nerve injuries which he would develop further in London. He established the Peripheral Nerve Injury Unit at Oxford and headed this for the duration of his time in Oxford. This unit collaborated on nerve injury research with two young biologists, J.Z.Young, who reported a successful technique for nerve repair in rabbits, and Peter Medawar, who would go on to win the Nobel Prize. Seddon's classification of nerve injuries came to be adopted internationally. He used the terms neurapraxia, axonotmesis and neurotmesis which had been coined by Lord Cohen of Birkenhead. These were based on the severity of the nerve injury, which in turn influenced the anticipated time for recovery and the prognosis. This was first published in 1942 and his subsequent 1943 publication became a standard work on the topic. The monograph which he edited for the Medical Research Council in 1954 became widely used to teach British medical students the principles of nerve injury.

In 1948 he was appointed Director of Postgraduate Studies at the new Institute of Orthopaedics at the University of London and Clinical Director of the Royal National Orthopaedic Hospital. in 1965 he was made the first Professor of Orthopaedics in the University of London. Here he directed research into basic science relevant to orthopaedic disease and he became a member of the Medical Research Council for four years. With his deputy director J.I.P.James he developed innovative postgraduate teaching programmes in orthopaedics which came to be highly regarded nationally and internationally. Because of his previous experience of polio in developing countries he served on the Advisory Medical Council of the Colonial Office.

In 1960 he examined Winston Churchill at the request of Lord Moran, Churchill's physician. Churchill had fallen, sustaining a crush fracture of the 5th thoracic vertebra and Seddon supervised the management of this, receiving letters of thanks and appreciation from Churchill. His opinion was sought again two years later when Churchill sustained a fracture of the neck of his left femur. Seddon's senior register Philip Yeoman joined the surgical team led by Philip Newman who successfully fixed the fracture with a nail and plate technique.

== Retirement ==
He remained busy following retirement in 1967. From 1967 until 1974 he worked for a month at a time as orthopaedic surgeon to the Lebanese army visiting Lebanon on 15 occasions. The major textbook The surgical disorders of the peripheral nerves, which he had agreed to write in 1941, was finally published in 1971. It became a standard work on the subject and a second edition was published in 1975. Further editions were published in 1998, 2011 and 2016 under the editorship of Rolfe Birch. Retaining his association with the Medical Research Council he helped to plan its research programme into tuberculosis of the vertebral column which was carried out at hospitals in Bulawayo, Hong Kong, Korea and South Africa. This resulted in a meticulously planned collaborative study which compared the surgical and medical treatment of tuberculosis of the spine.

== Honours and awards ==
Seddon was appointed a Companion of the Order of St Michael and St George (CMG) in 1951. He received the Robert Jones Medal, and his Robert Jones lecture in 1960 was devoted to nerve grafting. For his work in Lebanon he was appointed an Officer of the Order of the Cedar of Lebanon. He was elected President of the British Orthopaedic Association and was made Knight Bachelor in 1964. Seddon was awarded honorary degrees by the Royal University of Malta and by the universities of Grenoble and Glasgow. He was granted Honorary Fellowship of Worcester College, Oxford, in 1966.

== Personal life ==
During his time in Michigan he married Mary Lytle, an art graduate. In the early days of their friendship she did not wish to call him Herbert, a name he disliked, so asked him what his middle initial 'J' stood for. When he would not tell her she guessed 'James' and he was known as 'Jim' to friends and family throughout life. They had a son James and a daughter Sally. Seddon's religious faith was important to him. He was raised in the Plymouth Brethren faith and later became an Anglican, serving as a lay reader in St John's Church, Stanmore. In 1951 he published an account of the Christian heritage in medicine.

== Death and legacy ==
Seddon died on 21 December 1977 in Edgware General Hospital.

The Seddon Medal is a silver medal awarded by the RNOH to a junior staff member for 'outstanding clinical research'. The Sir Herbert Seddon teaching Centre at the RNOH at Stanmore is named for him.

== Selected publications ==
- "Three types of nerve injury" (1943) Brain. 66(4);237–288 doi:10.1093/brain/66.4.237
- Peripheral nerve injuries. Medical Research Council & Seddon, H. J. (1954). London: H.M. Stationery Office
- "Volkmann's Ischaemia" (1964) The British Medical Journal. 1, no. 5398: 1587–1592.
- "Biomechanics" (1966) The British Medical Journal. 2, no. 5504: 36–37.
- "Orthopaedic surgery" (1966) British Journal of Surgery. 53, no. 10: 836–839.
- "Some Reflections On Medical Records" (1971) The British Medical Journal. 4, no. 5779: 103–105.
- Surgical Disorders of the Peripheral Nerves (1971) Edinburgh; New York: Churchill Livingstone.
