= Electroneuronography =

Medical test

- Synonyms: Electroneurography
- Purpose: used to study the facial nerve (Bell's palsy)

Electroneuronography or electroneurography (ENoG) is a neurological non-invasive test used to study the facial nerve in cases of muscle weakness in one side of the face (Bell's palsy). The technique of electroneuronography was first used by Esslen and Fisch in 1979 to describe a technique that examines the integrity and conductivity of peripheral nerves. In modern use, ENoG is used to describe study of the facial nerve, while the term nerve conduction study is employed for other nerves.

It consists of a brief electrical stimulation of the nerve in one point underneath the skin, and at the same time recording the electrical activity (compound action potentials) at another point of the nerve's trajectory in the body. The response is displayed in a cathode-ray tube (CRT) or through the video monitor of a computer. The stimulation as well as the recording are carried out by disc electrodes taped to the skin, and the technician may use electrically conducting gel or paste to bolster the signals being input and output. Alternatively, the recording electrodes may also be used to pick up the electrical activity of a muscle innervated by that nerve. In such instances electroneuronography is closely related to electromyography.

It is performed by an audiologist, who carries out tests to compare the two sides of the face. The stimulation electrode is located at the stylomastoid foramen and the recording electrode is located near the nasolabial fold. The ENoG test is the only objective measure of facial nerve integrity.

== Background ==
In the human body there are twelve pairs of cranial nerves. Electroneuronography is typically concerned with the amount of degradation in the facial nerves, each of which consists of thousands of fibers. Motor and sensory fibers are typically found in a 2:1 ratio, and it has been proposed that only half of the motor units need to be functional for normal nerve conduction to take place. The facial nerves originate in the brainstem, cross through the auditory canal, exit the skull at the stylomastoid foramen, and terminate face in 2 main branches on each side of the face. These control muscle contractions and facial expressions.

Facial nerve paralysis can impact several aspects of a person's life, ranging from emotional or psychological effects to the actual physical limitations themselves. People who have been affected by such conditions often have difficulty speaking, drinking, eating, and showing the simplest of facial expressions. All of these combine to limit socialization and active involvement in the public domain. The proper assessment of facial nerve integrity is, therefore, vital to the detection and treatment of such disorders. Electroneuronography is used as a basis for a physician's course of action in managing disease. A doctor may opt for continued observation of the patient following initial testing, or they may recommend surgery to deal with the damage.

Facial nerve disorders may stem from a myriad of contributing factors: Bell's palsy, injury resulting from surgical error, trauma to the temporal bone, otitis media, multiple sclerosis, mumps, chicken pox, and other conditions.

== Testing method ==
=== Recording techniques ===
Electroneuronography tests are performed by audiologists. Typically, the system calculates the difference between compound muscle action potentials generated near the nose (nasolabial fold) in response to supramaximal electrical stimulation near the ear (stylomastoid foramen). Thus, the electrical stimulus travels along the facial nerve, allowing it to be specifically pinpointed. Increasing sensitivity and specificity of the recordings has been a constant goal, and it is believed that variability arises from the location and pressure of the electrodes, the stimulating current, and skin resistance. Esslen and Fisch placed the electrodes on the nasolabial fold, and this has become the standard, but May and Hughes experimented with electrodes placed on the nasal ala, citing better waveforms. The two positions were compared with respect to supramaximal threshold, waveform shape/amplitude, and repeatability. With regard to the supramaximal threshold, the nasal alae demonstrated a superior biphasic waveform while requiring less input stimulation to yield adequate results. In all other categories, however, there was no statistical difference between taking measurements at the nasolabial fold compared to the nasal alae.

It is common for a general feeling of discomfort to accompany the electrical stimulation of the nerve, but nearly all patients prefer to undergo the procedure in order to effect a treatment for their condition. Measurements are generally taken on the normal, unaffected side of the face first, and then on the abnormal side. Bipolar stimulation is generated at the stylomastoid foramen, while the recording electrodes are attached at the terminal ends of the nerve near the nose. A ground electrode is placed in the center of the patient's forehead, sufficiently far from the facial nerve as to not give an output reading. A variety of stimulation locations may also be employed, to get the best possible results. Audiologists aim to get the most efficient readings possible by optimizing results with a minimal input stimulus. The amount of damage is calculated as a ratio of how much nerve conduction has been retained by the affected side compared to the healthy value. Massive amounts of clinical experience may be required to accurately interpret the data received from testing, and misreading the results may put the patient at serious risk of developing further damage or creating a problem with otherwise healthy facial nerves.

=== Analyzing the results ===
Amplitude is the key component in the interpretation of electroneuronography tests. The resulting waveforms are analyzed and reported as a percentage using the following formula:

Dysfunctional Side (volts) / Healthy Side (volts) = Percentage of Response

Other forms of recording the output include using a percentage of fibers that are no longer active. This is essentially the same as subtracting the percentage of response from 100%. Either method is clinically accepted, provided the terminology is consistent and not interchanged.

Any responsive level above 10% is regarded as being able to spontaneously recover and does not typically require surgical intervention. Anything beneath the threshold usually requires active and invasive means to correct. To ensure accurate results, and consequently an appropriate course of action, readings may need to be taken every few days until fairly constant values are recorded.

== Diagnostic uses ==
=== Alternative tests ===
Several alternative procedures exist for testing facial nerve integrity. Electromyography, Acoustic reflex testing (formerly the gold standard), MRI, CT scanning, transcranial magnetic stimulation, blink reflex tests, and maximal/minimal stimulation tests may also be used to assess the viability of the nerves. Currently, however, electroneuronography serves as the only objective test compared to these options, and the test is preferentially performed before the others.

=== House–Brackmann score ===
The House–Brackmann score is the standard used by medical professionals to evaluate facial nerve function. It is a measure of the range of intentional motion the patient's facial muscles have, and is based largely on the observations of the physician. Because of the subjective nature of the scale, there may be discrepancies between assessments by different doctors, but the overall reliability and ease of use has made this scale the most commonly employed by medical professionals.

The scale itself consists of six levels of facial nerve function, ranging from healthy (level 1) to a total lack of movement (level 6). When performing a visual examination, the level at which the patient's facial nerves are functioning is reported as a fraction of the 6 levels. Therefore, someone with normal facial nerve integrity would be reported as "1/6," or "level 1 of 6." Grade two is associated with mild weakening of the facial nerve, and grades three and four have moderate damage, varying only on the basis of the ability to close the eye. The next two levels include severe impairment and total paralysis, respectively. Electroneuronography may only be employed in the most severe instances (5/6 or 6/6) because in the other cases there is clear evidence that the nerve is mostly intact. Even so, it may be helpful to chart a patient's progress beginning at the lowest levels of damage.

=== Common causes of weakness ===
Perhaps the most common cause of damage to the facial nerve is Bell's palsy (BP). It has a reported incidence of about 0.00015% within the world population each year, and in up to approximately 10% of those cases, the disorder will recur. The etiology of this disease is currently unknown, but hypotheses include infections, genetic predisposition, environmental factors, and neuropathy. Among those who develop the disorder, unilateral paralysis of the facial muscles occurs in a day or two, but it is common for the patient to recover on their own over the span of a few weeks. Even if the condition is resolved, the patient still stands a 20% chance of having lifelong weakness in their facial muscles, and 5% of these people will have permanent damage equivalent to a level of 4 or higher on the House-Brackmann scale.

Another possible effect of Bell's palsy is Wallerian degeneration (WD), which may take days to become evident. Because of the slow-acting nature of this pathology, a patient may present healthy electroneuronography results despite a lack of volitional control of the facial muscles immediately following the onset of Bell's palsy. This is because the degeneration has not yet reached completion, and some fibers are still intact. Therefore, it is standard procedure to wait at least three days after symptoms present themselves to perform an electroneuronography test, in order to prevent false negatives. At the other end of the spectrum, tests are generally not recommended after a period of twenty-one days. Typically, electroneuronography recordings are taken on the third day of symptoms and repeated every four days until a plateau is reached.

=== Facial nerve injury ===
Seddon classified facial nerve injuries into three broad categories: neuropraxia, neurotmesis, and axonotmesis. Neuropraxia is the most common form of injury associated with Bell's palsy, and it is characterized by paralysis without a degeneration of the peripheral nerve. Electroneuronography would yield a normal or mildly impaired response, as the nerve fibers are still whole but unresponsive to conscious control. Neurotmesis is regarded as the worst possible outcome, with electroneuronography readings equivalent to a flat line, or no response to stimulation. This represents total degradation of the facial nerve. Lastly, axonotmesis consists of damage to the inner nerve fibers while the outer covering remains whole, and also yields a flat line in response to stimulation. Because of their similar recordings, electroneuronography cannot, by itself, distinguish between the latter two forms of nerve injury.

== See also ==
- Electromyography
- Electromyoneurography
- Bell's palsy
- Microneurography
- Wallerian degeneration
- Neuropraxia
- Neurotmesis
- Axonotmesis
