= Brachial plexus injury =

- Other names: Backpack palsy (BPP), rucksack palsy, rucksack paralysis
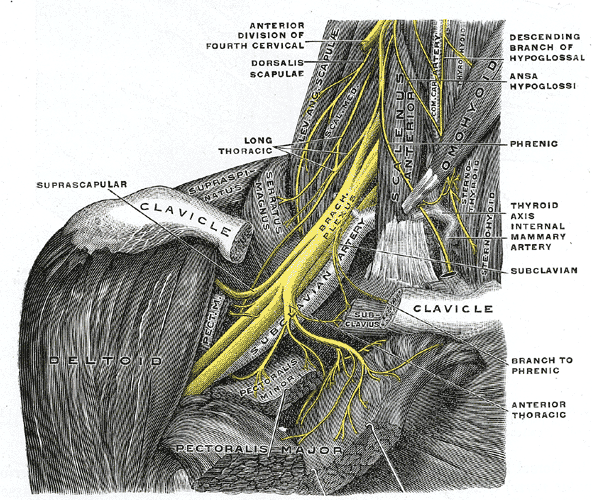
- The right brachial plexus with its short branches, viewed from in front
- Specialty: Emergency medicine

A brachial plexus injury (BPI), also known as brachial plexus lesion, is an injury to the brachial plexus, the network of nerves that conducts signals from the spinal cord to the shoulder, arm and hand. These nerves originate in the fifth, sixth, seventh and eighth cervical (C5–C8), and first thoracic (T1) spinal nerves, and innervate the muscles and skin of the chest, shoulder, arm and hand.

Brachial plexus injuries can occur as a result of shoulder trauma (e.g. dislocation), tumours, or inflammation, or during childbirth (obstetric.) Obstetric injuries may occur from mechanical injury involving shoulder dystocia during difficult childbirth, with a prevalence of 1 in 1000 births.

"The brachial plexus may be injured by falls from a height on to the side of the head and shoulder, whereby the nerves of the plexus are violently stretched. The brachial plexus may also be injured by direct violence or gunshot wounds, by violent traction on the arm, or by efforts at reducing a dislocation of the shoulder joint".

The rare Parsonage–Turner syndrome causes brachial plexus inflammation without obvious injury, but with nevertheless disabling symptoms.

== Signs and symptoms ==
Signs and symptoms may include a limp or paralyzed arm, lack of muscle control in the arm, hand, or wrist, and lack of feeling or sensation in the arm or hand. Although several mechanisms account for brachial plexus injuries, the most common is nerve compression or stretch. Infants, in particular, may experience brachial plexus injuries during delivery and these present with typical patterns of weakness, depending on which portion of the brachial plexus is involved. The most severe form of injury is nerve root avulsion, which usually accompanies high-velocity impacts that commonly occur during motor-vehicle collisions or bicycle accidents.

=== Disabilities ===
Based on the location of the nerve damage, brachial plexus injuries can affect part of or the entire arm. For example, musculocutaneous nerve damage weakens elbow flexors, median nerve damage causes proximal forearm pain, and paralysis of the ulnar nerve causes weak grip and finger numbness. In some cases, these injuries can cause total and irreversible paralysis. In less severe cases, these injuries limit use of these limbs and cause pain.

The cardinal signs of brachial plexus injury then, are weakness in the arm, diminished reflexes, and corresponding sensory deficits.

1. Erb's palsy. "The position of the limb, under such conditions, is characteristic: the arm hangs by the side and is rotated medially; the forearm is extended and pronated. The arm cannot be raised from the side; all power of flexion of the elbow is lost, as is also supination of the forearm".
2. In Klumpke's paralysis, a form of paralysis involving the muscles of the forearm and hand, a characteristic sign is the clawed hand, due to loss of function of the ulnar nerve and the intrinsic muscles of the hand it supplies.

== Causes ==
In most cases, the nerve roots are stretched or torn from their origin, since the meningeal covering of a nerve root is thinner than the sheath enclosing the nerve. The epineurium of the nerve is contiguous with the dura mater, providing extra support to the nerve.

Brachial plexus lesions typically result from excessive stretching; from rupture injury where the nerve is torn but not at the spinal cord; or from avulsion injuries, where the nerve is torn from its attachment at the spinal cord. A bony fragment, pseudoaneurysm, hematoma, or callus formation of fractured clavicle can also put pressure on the injured nerve, disrupting innervation of the muscles. A trauma directly on the shoulder and neck region can crush the brachial plexus between the clavicle and the first rib.

Although injuries can occur at any time, many brachial plexus injuries happen during birth: the baby's shoulders may become impacted during the birth process causing the brachial plexus nerves to stretch or tear. Obstetric injuries may occur from mechanical injury involving shoulder dystocia during difficult childbirth, the most common of which result from injurious stretching of the child's brachial plexus during birth, most often during vaginal birth, but occasionally Caesarean section. The excessive stretch results in incomplete sensory and/or motor function of the injured nerve.

Injuries to the brachial plexus result from excessive stretching or tearing of the C5-T1 nerve fibers. These injuries can be located in front of or behind the clavicle, nerve disruptions, or root avulsions from the spinal cord. These injuries are diagnosed based on clinical exams, axon reflex testing, and electrophysiological testing. Brachial plexus injuries require quick treatment in order for the patient to make a full functional recovery (Tung, 2003). These types of injuries are most common in young adult males.

Traumatic brachial plexus injuries may arise from several causes, including sports, high-velocity motor vehicle accidents, especially in motorcyclists, but also all-terrain-vehicle (ATV) and other accidents. Injury from a direct blow to the lateral side of the scapula is also possible. The severity of nerve injuries may vary from a mild stretch to the nerve root tearing away from the spinal cord (avulsion). "The brachial plexus may be injured by falls from a height on to the side of the head and shoulder, whereby the nerves of the plexus are violently stretched... The brachial plexus may also be injured by direct violence or gunshot wounds, by violent traction on the arm, or by efforts at reducing a dislocation of the shoulder joint".

Brachial plexus lesions can be divided into three types:

1. An upper brachial plexus lesion, which occurs from excessive lateral neck flexion away from the shoulder. Most commonly, improper use of forceps during delivery or falling on the neck at an angle causes upper plexus lesions leading to Erb's palsy. This type of injury produces a very characteristic sign called Waiter's tip deformity due to loss of the lateral rotators of the shoulder, arm flexors, and hand extensor muscles.
2. Less frequently, the whole brachial plexus lesion occurs;
3. most infrequently, sudden upward pulling on an abducted arm (as when someone breaks a fall by grasping a tree branch) produces a lower brachial plexus lesion, in which the eighth cervical (C8) and first thoracic (T1) nerves are injured "either before or after they have joined to form the lower trunk. The subsequent paralysis affects, principally, the intrinsic muscles of the hand and the flexors of the wrist and fingers". This results in a form of paralysis known as Klumpke's paralysis.

Backpack palsy is caused by much use of a heavy backpack whose pack-straps chronically press on the brachial plexus.

== Mechanism ==
Injury to the brachial plexus can happen in numerous environments. These may include contact sports, motor vehicle accidents, and birth. Although these are but a common few events, there is one of two mechanisms of injury that remain constant during the point of injury. The two mechanisms that can occur are traction and heavy impact.

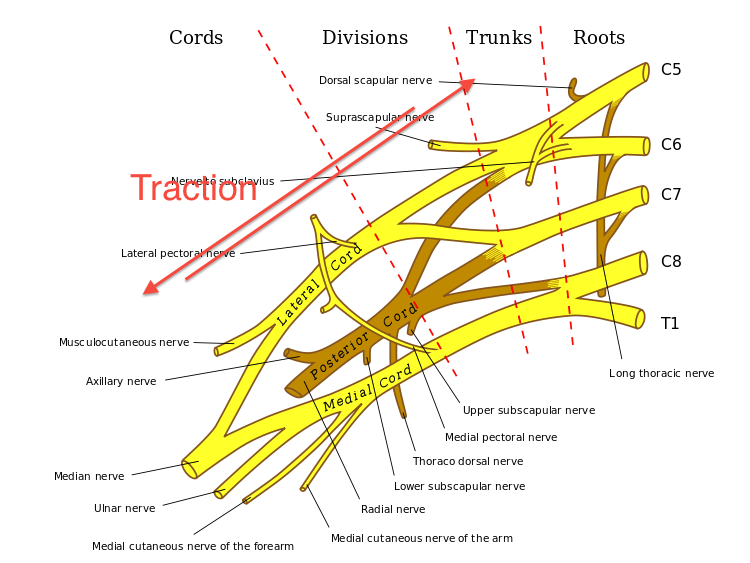
Traction, also known as stretch injury, is one of the mechanisms that cause brachial plexus injury. The nerves of the brachial plexus are damaged due to the forced pull by the widening of the shoulder and neck. This is a closer look at the traction mechanism at the cervical spine. The arrowed red line represents the stretch of the nerves. Depending on the force, lesions may occur.

=== Anatomy ===
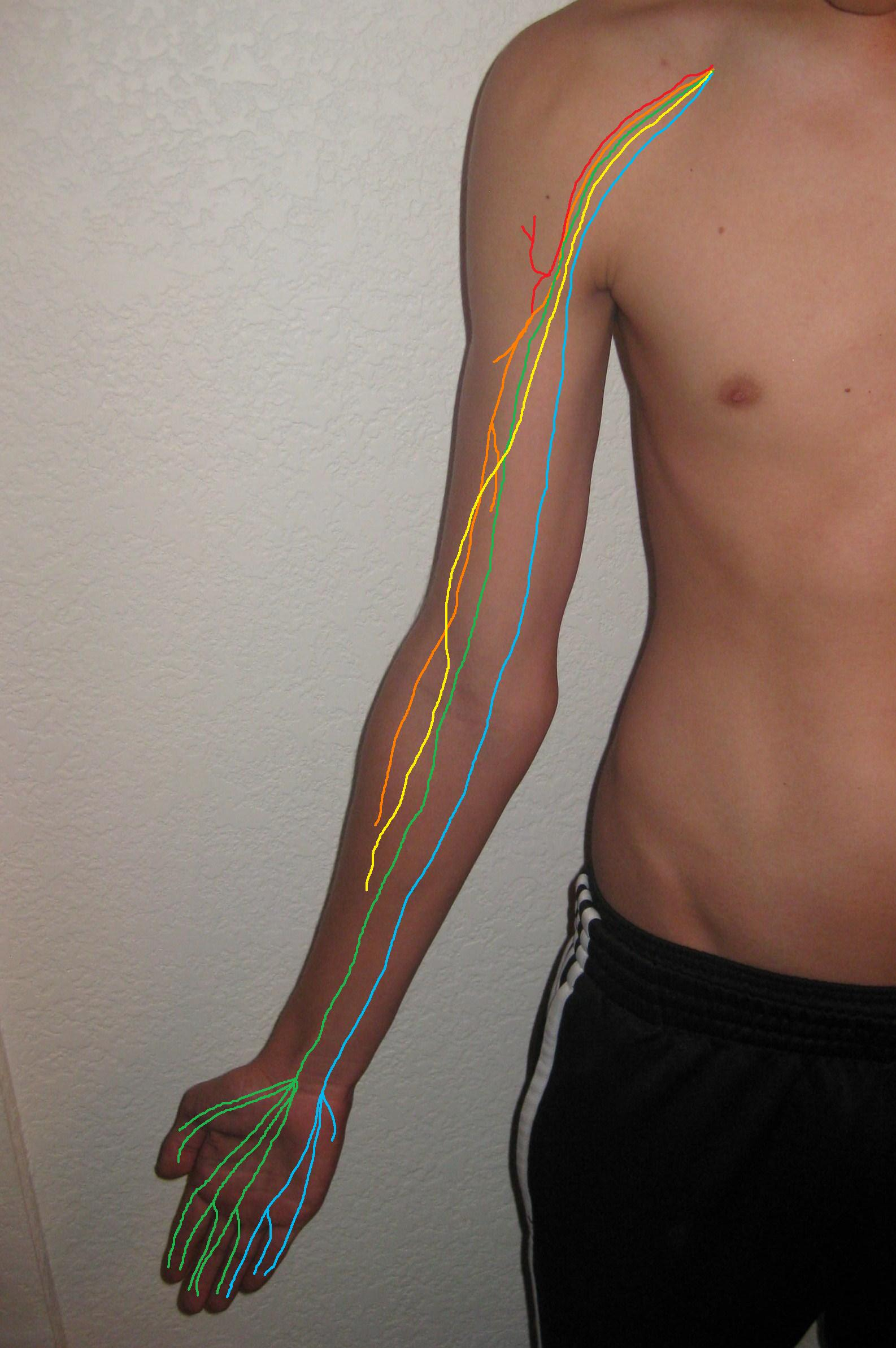
This image shows the anterior view of the five brachial plexus nerves on the human arm. Axillary, Median, Musculocutaneous, Radial, Ulnar.

The brachial plexus is made up of spinal nerves that are part of the peripheral nervous system. It includes sensory and motor nerves that innervate the upper limbs. The brachial plexus includes the last four cervical nerves (C5-C8) and the 1st thoracic nerve (T1). Each of those nerves splits into smaller trunks, divisions, and cords. The lateral cord includes the musculocutaneous nerve and lateral branch of the median nerve. The medial cord includes the medial branch of the median nerve and the ulnar nerve. The posterior cord includes the axillary nerve and radial nerve.

=== Traction ===
Traction occurs from severe movement and causes a pull or tension among the nerves. There are two types of traction: downward traction and upward traction. In downward traction there is tension of the arm which forces the angle of the neck and shoulder to become broader. This tension is forced and can cause lesions of the upper roots and trunk of the nerves of the brachial plexus. Motorcycle accidents and sports injuries usually cause this type of injury to brachial plexus. Upward traction also results in the broadening of the scapulo-humoral angle but this time the nerves of T1 and C8 are torn away. Humeral fractures and shoulder dislocations can also cause this type of injury with high energy injuries.

Root avulsion or nerve rupture may occur during severe trauma, inappropriate surgical positioning, or inappropriate use of surgical retractors. There are two mechanisms for root avulsion injury: peripheral and central mechanism. In peripheral mechanism, traction is transmitted to the rootlet, however dura mater will be torn with the rootlet intact because the dura is less elastic when compared to the rootlet. Pseudomeningocele can be shown on cervical myelography. On the other hand, through central mechanism, the head and neck is pushed along with the spinal roots of the brachial plexus to the opposite site of the body, leading to direct nerve root injury but the dura sheath remains intact. In this case, anterior roots are more prone than posterior roots for avulsion, thus the C8 and T1 nerve roots are more prone to injury. Root avulsion injury can be further divided based on the location of the lesion: pre- and postganglionic lesions. In a preganglionic lesion, the sensory fibre remain attached to the cell body of the sensory ganglion, thus there is no wallerian degeneration of the sensory fibre, thus sensory action potential can still be detected at the distal end of the spinal nerve. However, those who get this type of lesion have sensory loss over the affected nerve roots. In this case, surgical repair of the lesion is not possible because the proximal nerve tissue is too short for stitching to be possible. For postganglionic lesions, the cell body of the sensory ganglion is detached from the spinal nerve, leading to wallerian degeneration of the sensory fibre. Thus, no action potential detected at the distal end of spinal nerve. However, surgical repair is possible because proximal nerve tissue has enough length for stitching.

=== Impact ===
Heavy impact to the shoulder is the second common mechanism to causing injury to the brachial plexus. Depending on the severity of the impact, lesions can occur at all nerves in the brachial plexus. The location of impact also affects the severity of the injury and depending on the location the nerves of the brachial plexus may be ruptured or avulsed. When passing through between the clavicle and first rib, the brachial plexus may be crushed in the costoclavicular space. This is usually due to direct trauma to the shoulder or neck region as a result of vehicular accidents, occupational injuries or sports injuries. The brachial plexus may also be compressed by surrounding damaged structures such as bone fragments or callus from the clavicular fracture, and hematoma or pseudoaneurysm from vascular injury. Cervical rib, prominent transverse process, and congenital fibrous bands can also compress the brachial plexus and cause thoracic outlet syndrome.

During the delivery of a baby, the shoulder of the baby may graze against the pelvic bone of the mother. During this process, the brachial plexus can receive damage resulting in injury. The incidence of this happening at birth is 1 in 1000. This is very low compared to the other identified brachial plexus injuries.

== Diagnosis ==
The most accurate test for diagnosing a brachial plexus injury is operative exploration of the potentially injured segments from the spinal roots to end-organs. Nerves should be evaluated under an operative microscope, with or without intraoperative electrical studies (e.g. bipolar stimulation, SEPs or MEPs) to supplement. Operative evaluation of the rootlets within the spinal canal and intraforaminal portion of the spinal roots proximal to the dorsal root ganglia (e.g. via hemilaminectomy or otherwise) is difficult and rarely clinically justifiable, so in the context of an apparently in-continuity root, preoperative imaging studies are the only method of evaluating this section of nerve.

The best non-invasive test for BPI is magnetic resonance imaging (MRI). MRI aids in the assessment of the injuries and is used to provide information on the portion of the plexus which cannot be operatively explored (the rootlets and roots). In addition, assessment of the cervical cord, post-traumatic changes in soft tissues and associated injuries (e.g. fractures, cuff tears, etc.) may be appreciated. Although superior to nerve conduction studies, ultrasound and other tests, conventional MRI has a poor specificity (72%) meaning that the false-positive rate is high and surgeons can't rely upon the test to guide treatment. Consequently, the future of peripheral nerve MR imaging (including imaging brachial plexus injuries) is likely to be based on diffusion-weighted imaging, such as diffusion tensor techniques, which are of significant potential clinical utility and can enable the production of easily interpreted 3D reconstructions of the spinal cord and brachial plexus such as this.

Several weeks/months after BPI, EMG examination can provide additional information about whether the muscle is denervated. These examinations are painful, highly user-dependent and lack normal values so cannot be relied upon.

=== Classification ===
The severity of brachial plexus injury is determined by the type of nerve damage. There are several different classification systems for grading the severity of nerve and brachial plexus injuries. Most systems attempt to correlate the degree of injury with symptoms, pathology and prognosis. Seddon's classification, devised in 1943, continues to be used, and is based on three main types of nerve fiber injury, and whether there is continuity of the nerve.

1. Neurapraxia: The mildest form of nerve injury. It involves an interruption of the nerve conduction without loss of continuity of the axon. Recovery takes place without wallerian degeneration.
2. Axonotmesis: Involves axonal degeneration, with loss of the relative continuity of the axon and its covering of myelin, but preservation of the connective tissue framework of the nerve (the encapsulating tissue, the epineurium and perineurium, are preserved).
3. Neurotmesis: The most severe form of nerve injury, in which the nerve is completely disrupted by contusion, traction or laceration. Not only the axon, but the encapsulating connective tissue lose their continuity. The most extreme degree of neurotmesis is transsection, although most neurotmetic injuries do not produce gross loss of continuity of the nerve but rather, internal disruption of the nerve architecture sufficient to involve perineurium and endoneurium as well as axons and their covering. It requires surgery, with unpredictable recovery.

A more recent and commonly used system described by the late Sir Sydney Sunderland, divides nerve injuries into five degrees: first degree or neurapraxia, following on from Seddon, in which the insulation around the nerve called myelin is damaged but the nerve itself is spared, and second through fifth degree, which denotes increasing severity of injury. With fifth degree injuries, the nerve is completely divided.

== Treatment ==
Treatment for brachial plexus injuries includes orthosis/splinting, occupational or physical therapy and, in some cases, surgery. Some brachial plexus injuries may heal without treatment. Many infants improve or recover within 6 months, but those that do not, have a very poor outlook and will need further surgery to try to compensate for the nerve deficits. The ability to bend the elbow (biceps function) by the third month of life is considered an indicator of probable recovery, with additional upward movement of the wrist, as well as straightening of thumb and fingers an even stronger indicator of excellent spontaneous improvement. Gentle range of motion exercises performed by parents, accompanied by repeated examinations by a physician, may be all that is necessary for patients with strong indicators of recovery. Furthermore, in a systematic review it has been noted that physical therapy interventions in children is able to improve range of motion, muscle strength, bone mineral density, and shoulder function; this can help children regain some or all the function they initially lost.

The exercises mentioned above can be done to help rehabilitate from mild cases of the injury. However, in more serious brachial plexus injuries surgical interventions can be used. Function can be restored by nerve repairs, nerve replacements, and surgery to remove tumors causing the injury. Another crucial factor to note is that psychological problems can hinder the rehabilitation process due to a lack of motivation from the patient. On top of promoting a lifetime process of physical healing, it is important to not overlook the psychological well-being of a patient. This is due to the possibility of depression or complications with head injuries.

=== Rehabilitation ===
There are many treatments to facilitate the process of recovery in people who have brachial plexus injuries. Improvements occur slowly and the rehabilitation process can take up to many years. Many factors should be considered when estimating recovery time, such as initial diagnosis of the injury, severity of the injury, and type of treatments used. Some forms of treatment include nerve grafts, medication, surgical decompression, nerve transfer, physical therapy, and occupational therapy.

=== Therapy ===
Physical and occupational therapy is important when dealing with a brachial plexus injuries. One of the main goals of rehabilitation is to prevent muscle atrophy until the nerves regain function. Electrical stimulation is an effective treatment to help patients reach this fundamental goal. Exercises that involve shoulder extension, flexion, elevation, depression, abduction and adduction facilitate healing by engaging the nerves in the damaged sites as well as improve muscle function. Stretching is done on a daily basis to improve or maintain range of motion. Stretching is important in order to rehabilitate since it increases the blood flow to the injury as well as facilitates nerves in functioning properly.

A study has also shown that a sensory-motor deficit in the upper limbs after a brachial plexus injury can affect the corporal balance in the vertical positioning. Examined patients had a lower score in the Berg Balance Scale, a greater difficulty in maintaining in the unipodal stance during one minute and leaned the body weight distribution to the side affected by the lesion. Patients also exhibited a greater variability in the postural oscillation, evaluated by the directional stability index. The results alert the clinical community about the necessity to prevent and treat secondary effects of this condition.

In studies about the effectiveness of additional effect of modified constraint induced movement therapy (MCIMT), it was found that MCIMT helped improved the range of motion, shoulder function and it has the potential to promote functional gains for children with BPBI.

== Epidemiology ==
Brachial plexus injury is found in both children and adults, but there is a difference between children and adults with BPI.

=== Adults ===
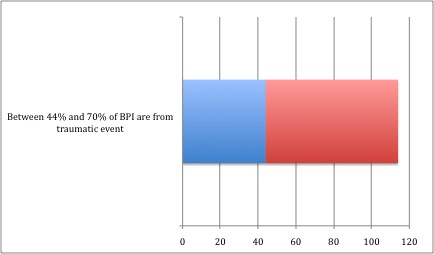
BPI traumatic event

The prevalence of brachial plexus injuries in North American adults in the 1900s was about 1.2%. Recent data from the UK suggests that the incidence is rising although the methods for capturing such data make computed incidence ratios unreliable. Traumatic BPI is most common in young healthy adults, aged 14 to 63 years old, with 50% of patients between 19 and 34 years old. The majority (89%) are male. Most injuries are sustained in vehicular collisions, particularly involving motorcycles; however, there is a substantial cohort of elderly patients sustaining TBPI, often from falls.

=== Children ===
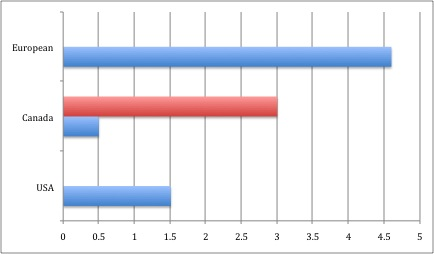
Incidence of OBPP

OBPP, also known as obstetrical brachial plexus palsy, occurs primarily in young children at a rate of 0.38 to 1.56 per 1000 live births depending on the type of care and the average birth weight of infants in different regions of the world. For example, a study in the United States showed and incidence of OBPP of about 1.51 cases per 1000 live births, in a Canadian study, the incidence was between 0.5 and 3 injuries per 1000 live births, a Dutch study reported an incidence of 4.6 per 1000 live births. The risk of BPI at birth is highest for infants weighing more than 4.5 kg at birth born to diabetic women. Type of delivery also affects the risk of BPI. Brachial plexus injury risks for newborns are increased with gained birth weight, birth delivery where a vacuum is assisted, and not being able to handle glucose.

=== Traumatic injuries ===
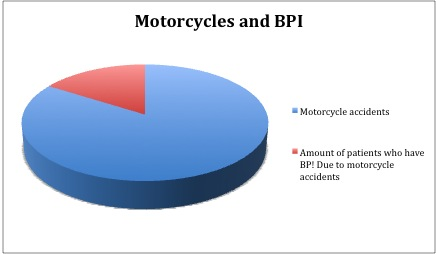
Motorcycles and BPI

BPI has shown to occur in 44% to 70% of traumatic injuries, such as motorcycle accidents, sporting activities, or workplace accidents. With 22% being motorcycle injuries and about 4.2% having plexus damage. People who have accidents with riding motorcycles and snowmobiles have higher risks of getting a BPI and with ihg-injury injuries such as motorcycle accidents, root avulsion from the spinal cord is the most common pattern of injury (~72% prevalence of at least 1 root avulsion) which requires surgery to reanimate the arm.

Recent nationwide registry data from England and Wales report that traumatic brachial plexus injuries most commonly follow vehicle collisions—with motorcycles/quad bikes the predominant vehicle type—while low-height falls are the next most frequent mechanism, particularly among older adults. The study also describes geographic variation in injury burden ("hotspots") and associations with socioeconomic deprivation.

== Prognosis ==
The site and type of brachial plexus injury determine the prognosis. Avulsion and rupture injuries require timely surgical intervention for any chance of recovery. Equally, reconstruction of elbow flexion in patients with pan-plexus injuries should be performed as soon as possible, because delays lead to worse motor outcomes. Most closed infra-clavicular injuries due to shoulder dislocation are managed non-operatively initially and data shows that most fail to recover sensory function but recover some motor function. For milder injuries involving buildup of scar tissue and for neurapraxia, the potential for improvement varies, but there is a fair prognosis for spontaneous recovery, with a 90–100% return of function.
