= Digestion chambers =

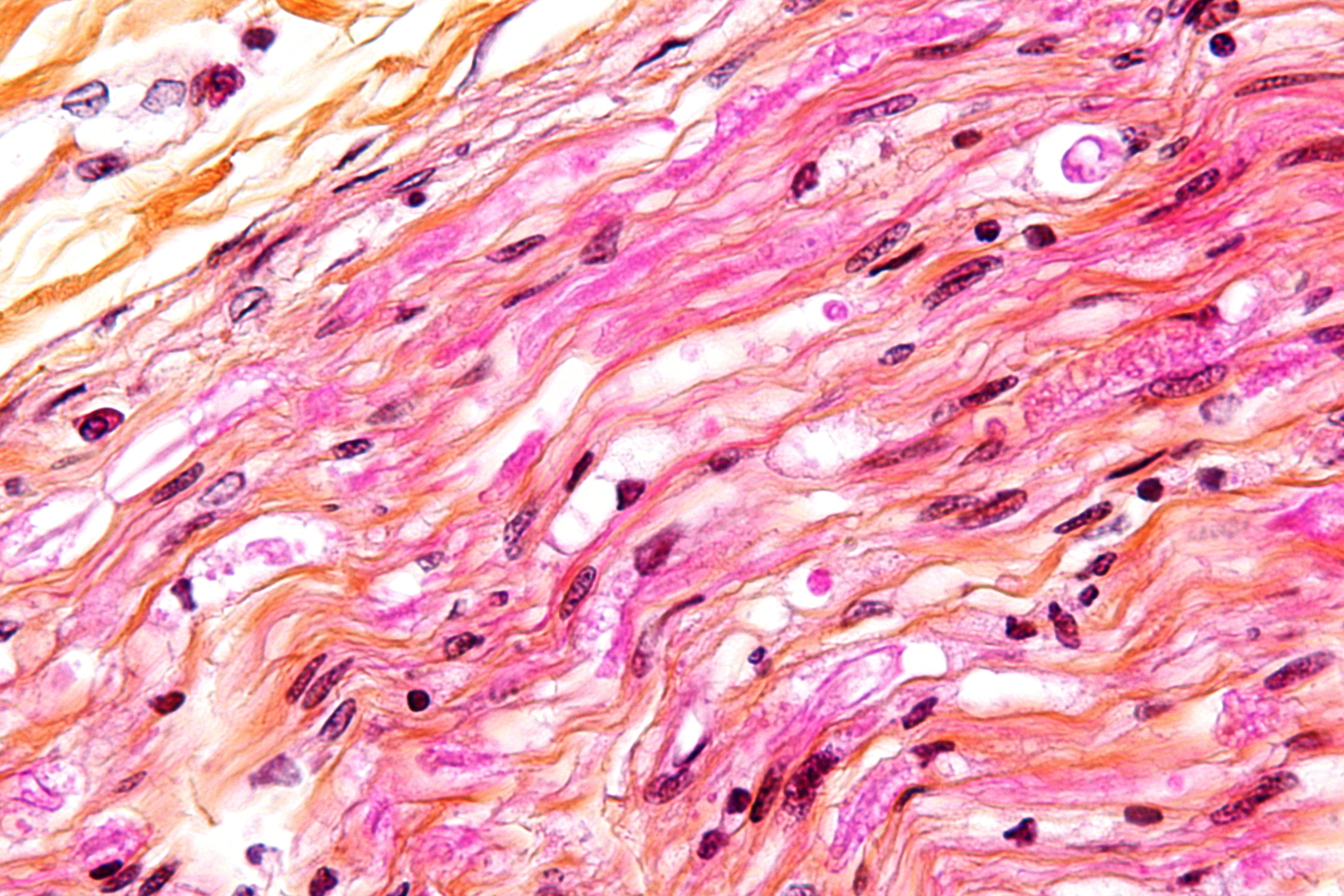
Micrograph showing digestion chambers. HPS stain.

Digestion chambers are a histologic finding in nerves that are undergoing Wallerian degeneration.

== Appearance ==
Digestion chambers consist of small globular fragments, which represent degenerating myelin sheaths.

== See also ==
- Nerve injury
