= Nerve injury =

Damage to nervous tissue

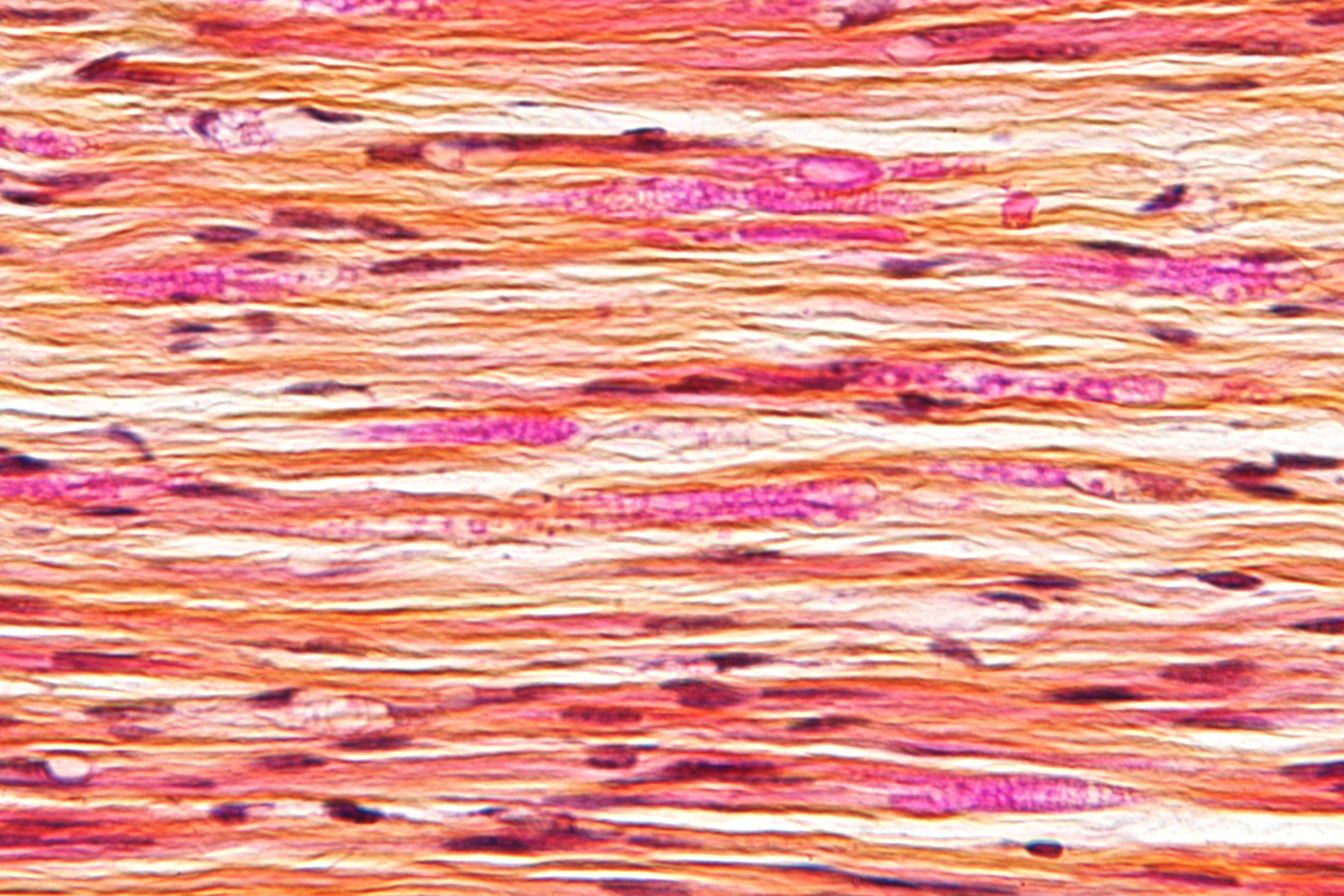
- Micrograph of a nerve with a decrease in myelinated nerve fibres (pink) and an abnormal increase in fibrous tissue (yellow), as may be seen in nerve injuries. HPS stain.
- Specialty: Neurology

Nerve injury is an injury to a nerve. There is no single classification system that can describe all the many variations of nerve injuries. In 1941, Herbert Seddon introduced a classification of nerve injuries based on three main types of nerve fiber injury and whether there is continuity of the nerve. Usually, however, nerve injuries are classified in five stages, based on the extent of damage to both the nerve and the surrounding connective tissue, since supporting glial cells may be involved.

Unlike in the central nervous system, neuroregeneration in the peripheral nervous system is possible. The processes that occur in peripheral regeneration can be divided into the following major events: Wallerian degeneration, axon regeneration/growth, and reinnervation of nervous tissue. The events that occur in peripheral regeneration occur with respect to the axis of the nerve injury. The proximal stump refers to the end of the injured neuron that is still attached to the neuron cell body; it is the part that regenerates. The distal stump refers to the end of the injured neuron that is still attached to the end of the axon; it is the part of the neuron that will degenerate, but the stump remains capable of regenerating its axons.

The study of nerve injury began during the American Civil War and greatly expanded during modern medicine with such advances as use of growth-promoting molecules.

== Types ==
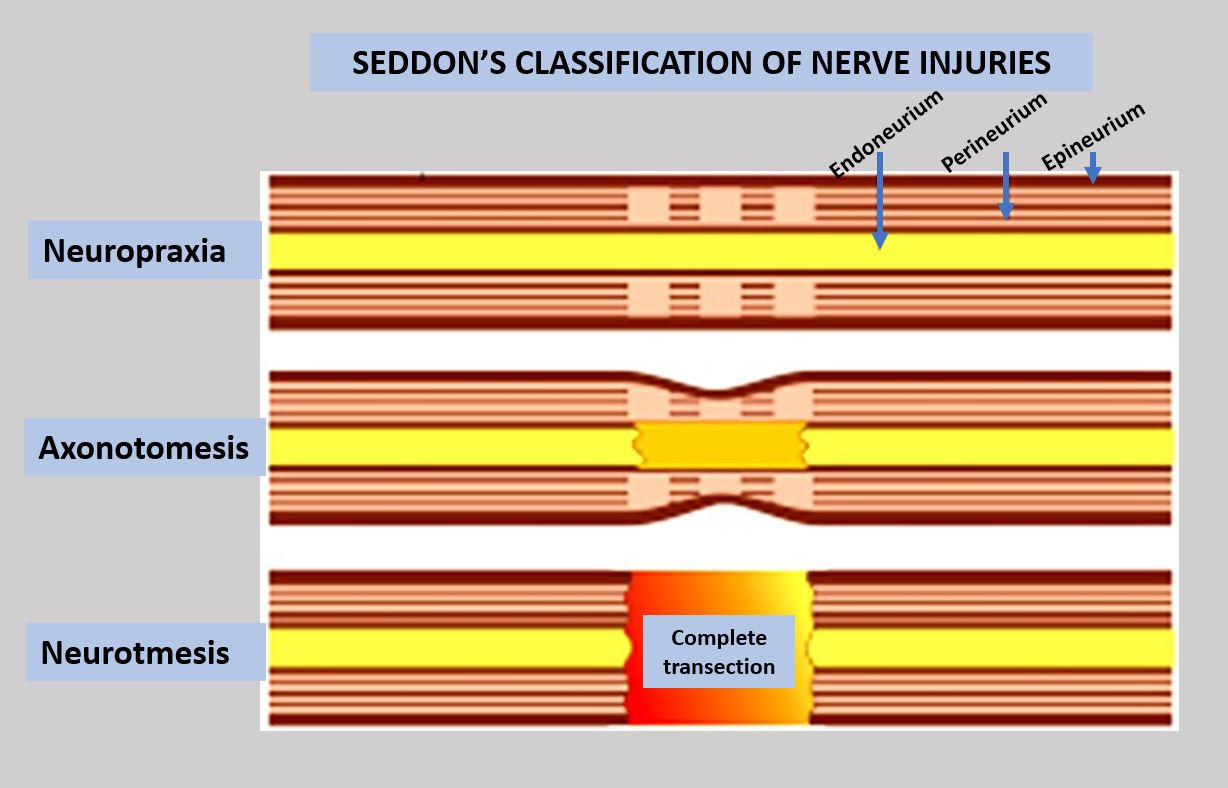

To assess the location and severity of a nerve injury, clinical assessment is commonly combined with electrodiagnostic tests. Injuries to the myelin are usually the least severe (neuropraxia), while injuries to the axons and supporting structures are more severe (axonotmesis is moderate injury, while neurotmesis is severe injury). It may be difficult to differentiate the severity by clinical findings due to common neurological impairments, including motor and sensory impairments distal to the lesion.

=== Neurapraxia ===
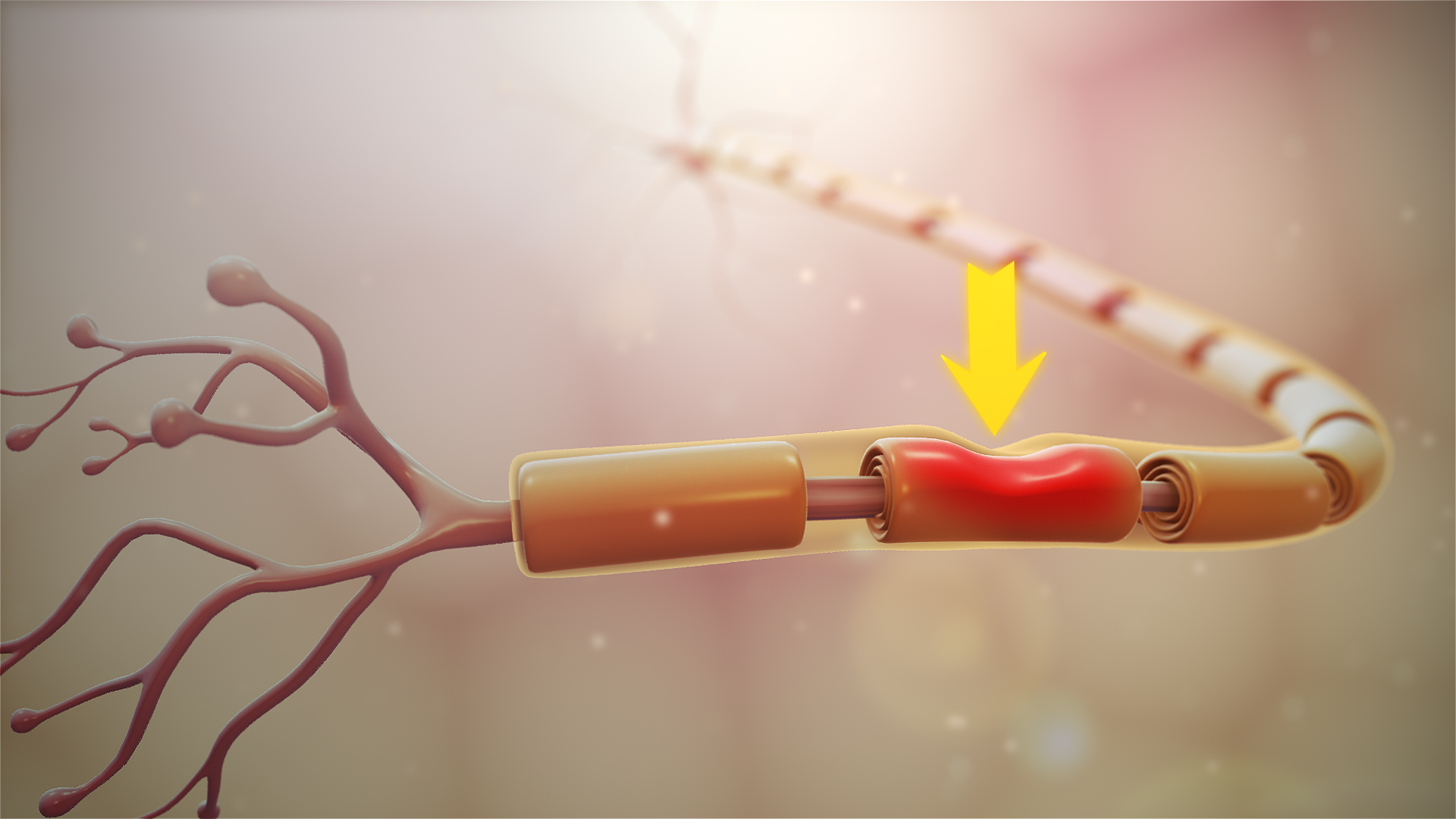
Nerve compression in neurapraxia

Neurapraxia is the least severe form of nerve injury, with complete recovery. In this case, the axon remains intact, but there is myelin damage causing an interruption in conduction of the impulse down the nerve fiber. Most commonly, this involves compression of the nerve or disruption to the blood supply (ischemia). There is a temporary loss of function which is reversible within hours to months of the injury (the average is 6–8 weeks). Wallerian degeneration does not occur, so recovery does not involve actual regeneration. There is frequently greater involvement of motor than sensory function with autonomic function being retained. In electrodiagnostic testing with nerve conduction studies, there is a normal compound motor action potential amplitude distal to the lesion at day 10, and this indicates a diagnosis of mild neurapraxia instead of axonotmesis or neurotmesis.

==== Salatory conduction in myelin ====
In many cases of neurapraxia, damage to the myelin sheath occurs, disrupting salatory conduction and disrupting the propagation of impulses along the nodes of Ranvier. Damage to myelin can slow or block conduction, leading to a temporary loss of motor coordination and sensory function until remyelination occurs.

=== Axonotmesis ===
Axonotmesis is a more severe nerve injury with disruption of the neuronal axon, but with maintenance of the epineurium. This type of nerve damage may cause paralysis of the motor, sensory, and autonomic functions, and is mainly seen in crush injury.

If the force creating the nerve damage is removed in a timely fashion, the axon may regenerate, leading to recovery. Electrically, the nerve shows rapid and complete degeneration, with loss of voluntary motor units. Regeneration of the motor end plates will occur, as long as the endoneural tubules are intact.

Axonotmesis involves the interruption of the axon and its covering of myelin, but with preservation of the connective tissue framework of the nerve (the encapsulating tissue, the epineurium and perineurium, are preserved). Because axonal continuity is lost, Wallerian degeneration occurs. Electromyography (EMG) performed 2 to 4 weeks later shows fibrillations and denervation potentials in musculature distal to the injury site. Loss in both motor and sensory spines is more complete with axonotmesis than with neurapraxia, and recovery occurs only through regenerations of the axons, a process requiring time.

Axonotmesis is usually the result of a more severe crush or contusion than neurapraxia, but can also occur when the nerve is stretched (without damage to the epineurium). There is usually an element of retrograde proximal degeneration of the axon, and for regeneration to occur, this loss must first be overcome. The regeneration fibers must cross the injury site and regeneration through the proximal or retrograde area of degeneration may require several weeks. Then the neuritis tip progresses down the distal site, such as the wrist or hand. Proximal lesion may grow distally as fast as 2 to 3 mm per day and distal lesion as slowly as 1.5 mm per day. Regeneration occurs over weeks to years.

=== Neurotmesis ===
Neurotmesis is the most severe lesion with no potential of full recovery. It occurs on severe contusion, stretch, or laceration. The axon and encapsulating connective tissue lose their continuity. The last (extreme) degree of neurotmesis is transsection, but most neurotmetic injuries do not produce gross loss of continuity of the nerve but rather internal disruption of nerve structures sufficient to involve perineurium and endoneurium as well as axons and their covering. Denervation changes recorded by EMG are the same as those seen with axonotmetic injury. There is a complete loss of motor, sensory and autonomic function. If the nerve has been completely divided, axonal regeneration causes a neuroma to form in the proximal stump. For neurotmesis, it is better to use a new more complete classification called the Sunderland System.

== Overview of peripheral regeneration ==
Wallerian degeneration is a process that occurs before nerve regeneration and can be described as a cleaning or clearing process that essentially prepares the distal stump for reinnervation. Schwann cells are glial cells in the peripheral nervous system that support neurons by forming myelin that encases nerves. During Wallerian degeneration Schwann cells and macrophages interact to remove debris, specifically myelin and the damaged axon, from the distal injury site. Calcium has a role in the degeneration of the damage axon. Bands of Büngner are formed when uninnervated Schwann cells proliferate and the remaining connective tissue basement membrane forms endoneurial tubes. Bands of Büngner are important for guiding the regrowing axon.

At the neuronal cell body, a process called chromatolysis occurs in which the nucleus migrates to the periphery of the cell body and the endoplasmic reticulum breaks up and disperses. Nerve damage causes the metabolic function of the cell to change from that of producing molecules for synaptic transmission to that of producing molecules for growth and repair. These factors include GAP-43, tubulin and actin. Chromatolysis is reversed when the cell is prepared for axon regeneration.

Axon regeneration is characterized by the formation of a growth cone, which has the ability to produce a protease that digests any material or debris that remains in its path of regeneration toward the distal site. The growth cone responds to molecules produced by Schwann cells such as laminin and fibronectin.

== Neuron-intrinsic changes ==
Immediately following injury, neurons undergo a large number of transcriptional and proteomic changes which switch the cell from a mature, synaptically active neuron to a synaptically silent, growth state. This process is dependent on new transcription, as blocking the ability of cells to transcribe new mRNA severely impairs regeneration. A number of signaling pathways have been shown to be turned on by axon injury and help to enable long distance regeneration including BMP, TGFβ, and MAPKs. Similarly, a growing number of transcription factors also boost the regenerative capacity of peripheral neurons including ASCL1, ATF3, CREB1, HIF1α, JUN, KLF6, KLF7, MYC, SMAD1, SMAD2, SMAD3, SOX11, SRF, STAT3, TP53, and XBP1. Several of these can also boost the regenerative capacity of CNS neurons, making them potential therapeutic targets for treating spinal cord injury and stroke.

== Role of Schwann cells ==
Guillain–Barré syndrome – nerve damage

Schwann cells are active in Wallerian degeneration. They not only have a role in phagocytosis of myelin, but they also have a role in recruitment of macrophages to continue the phagocytosis of myelin. The phagocytic role of Schwann cells has been investigated by studying the expression of molecules in Schwann cells that are typically specific to inflammatory macrophages. Expression of one such molecule MAC-2, a galactose-specific lectin, is observed in not only degenerating nerves that are macrophage-rich but also degenerating nerves that are macrophage-scarce and Schwann cell-rich. Furthermore, the effects of MAC-2 in degenerating nerves are associated with myelin phagocytosis. There was a positive correlation between the amount of MAC-2 expression and the extent of myelin phagocytosis. A deficiency in MAC-2 expression can even cause inhibition of myelin removal from injury sites.

Schwann cells are active in demyelination of injured nerves before macrophages are even present at the site of nerve injury. Electron microscopy and immunohistochemical staining analysis of teased nerve fibers shows that before macrophages arrive at the injury site, myelin is fragmented and myelin debris and lipid droplets are found in the cytoplasm of Schwann cells, indicating phagocytic activity before macrophages arrive.

Schwann cell activity includes recruitment of macrophages to the injury site. Monocyte chemoattractant protein (MCP-1) plays a role in recruiting monocytes/macrophages. In tellurium-induced demylenation with no axon degeneration, nerve crush with axon degeneration, and nerve transection with axon degeneration an increase in MCP-1 mRNA expression followed by an increase in macrophage recruitment occurred. In addition varying levels of MCP-1 mRNA expression also had an effect. Increased MCP-1 mRNA levels correlated positively with an increase in macrophage recruitment. Furthermore, in situ hybridation determined that the cellular source of MCP-1 was Schwann cells.

Schwann cells play an important role in not only producing neurotrophic factors such as nerve growth factor (NGF) and ciliary neurotrophic factor (CNTF), which promote growth, of both the damaged nerve and supporting Schwann cells, but also producing neurite promoting factors, which guide the growing axon, both of which are discussed below.

== Role of macrophages ==
The primary role of macrophages in peripheral regeneration is demylenation during Wallerian degeneration. Immunohistochemical analysis showed that in tellurium demylenated, crushed, and cut nerves, expression of lysozyme, which is a marker for myelin phagocytosis, and of ED1, which is a marker for macrophages, occurred in the same region. Lysozyme was also investigated with respect to the temporal progression of myelin phagocytosis by macrophages in nerve injury. Northern blotting showed that peak lysozyme mRNA expression occurred at an appropriate time with respect to temporal models of myelin phagocytosis. Macrophages do not phagocytose all cellular debris at the nerve injury site; they are selective and will salvage certain factors. Macrophages produce apolipoprotein E which is involved in rescuing cholesterol in damaged nerves. In the same investigation, temporal levels of apolipoprotein E mRNA expression in the three models for demylenation and nerve damage were consistent with respect to models for cholesterol salvage in nerve injury. Macrophages play a role in salvaging cholesterol during nerve injury.

Macrophages also play a role in inducing the proliferation of Schwann cells that occurs during Wallerian degeneration. Supernatant has been collected from medium in which macrophages are active in myelin phagocytosis where lysosomal processing of the myelin occurs within the macrophage. The supernatant contains a mitogenic factor, a mitosis promoting factor, that is characterized heat and trypsin sensitivity, both of which characterize it as a peptide. Treatment of Schwann cells with the collected supernatant shows that it is a mitogenic factor and thus plays an important role in the proliferation of Schwann cells.

Macrophages are also involved in the secretion factors that promote nerve regeneration. Macrophages secrete not only interleukin-1, a cytokine that induces expression of nerve growth factor (NGF) in Schwann cells but also an interleukin-1 receptor antagonist (IL-1ra). Expression of IL-1ra in mice with transected sciatic nerves via implantation of a tube releasing IL-1ra showed the regrowth of fewer myelinated and unmyelinated axons. Macrophage secretion of interleukin-1 is involved in stimulation of nerve regeneration.

== Role of neurotrophic factors ==
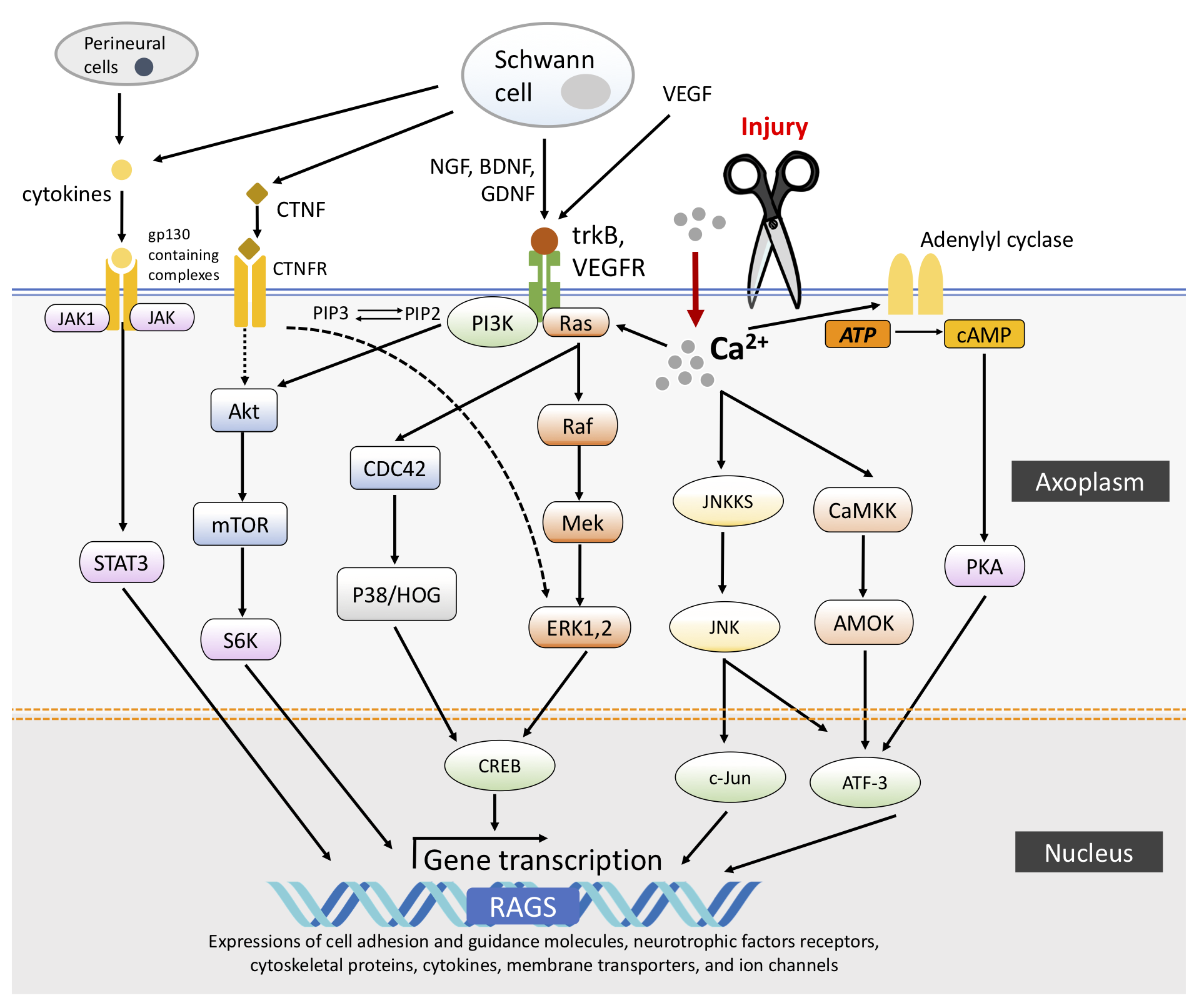
Several signaling pathways are upregulated following a nerve injury.

Neurotrophic factors are those that promote survival and growth of neurons. A trophic factor can be described as a factor that is associated with providing nourishment to allow for growth. In general they are protein ligands for tyrosine kinase receptors; binding to the specific receptor yields autophosphorylation and subsequent phosphorylation of tyrosine residues on proteins that participate in further downstream signaling to activate proteins and genes involved in growth and proliferation. Neurotrophic factors act through retrograde transport in neurons, in which they are taken up by the growth cone of the injured neuron and transported back to the cell body. These neurotrophic factors have both autocrine and paracrine effects, as they promote growth of the damaged neurons as well as the adjacent Schwann cells.

Nerve growth factor (NGF) typically has a low level of expression in nerves that are healthy and not growing or developing, but in response to nerve injury NGF expression increases in Schwann cells. This is a mechanism to increase growth and proliferation of Schwann cells at the distal stump in order to prepare for reception of the regenerating axon. NGF has not only a trophic role but also a tropic or guiding role. The Schwann cells that form the bands of Bungner at the distal injury site express NGF receptors as a guiding factor for the regenerating axon of the injured neuron. NGF bound to the receptors on Schwann cells provides the growing neurons that are contacted with a trophic factor to promote further growth and regeneration

Ciliary neurotrophic factor (CNTF) typically has a high level of expression in Schwann cells associated with nerves that are healthy, but in response to nerve injury CNTF expression decreases in Schwann cells distal to the injury site and remains relatively low unless the injured axon begins to regrow. CNTF has numerous trophic roles in motor neurons in the peripheral nervous system including the prevention of atrophy of dennervated tissue and the prevention of degeneration and death of motor neurons after nerve injury. (frostick) In sciatic motor neurons both CNTF receptor mRNA expression and CNTF receptor is increased after injury for a prolonged time frame compared to the short time frame in the central nervous system suggesting a role for CNTF in nerve regeneration.

Insulin-like growth factors (IGFs) have been shown to increase the rate of peripheral nervous system axon regeneration. IGF-I and IGF-II mRNA levels are significantly increased distal to the site of crush injury in rat sciatic nerves. At the site of nerve repair, locally delivered IGF-I can significantly increase the rate of axon regeneration within a nerve graft and help expedite functional recovery of a paralyzed muscle.

=== Neuroprotective and adjunctive therapies ===
The neuroprotective role of B12 supplements is not fully understood, although numerous animal studies support their role in recovery at both the molecular and structural levels. Current animal studies suggest B12 may have neuroprotective effects, specifically at maintaining nerve conduction through the process of saltatory conduction. Currently, 15 animal studies highlight B12 for its role in nerve cell survival and remyelination. In instances of post-acute injury, B12 supplementation may support nerve cell survival, potentially reducing degeneration that can lead to axonotmesis. In neurapraxia, B12 may serve to support the reconstruction site for myelin sheaths.

Within the broader context of neuroscience, cobalamin (B12) has been established as an enzyme cofactor, a necessary precursor for myelin synthesis and neurotransmitter regulation. B12 deficiency is correlated to neurological complications and neuropathy; however, the latter and overall role of B12 is perhipheral nere recovery is still under investigation.

== Role of neurite-promoting factors ==
Neurite promoting factors include many extracellular matrix proteins produced by Schwann cells at the distal stump including fibronectin and laminin. Fibronectin are components of the basal lamina and promote neurite growth and adhesion of the growth cone to the basal lamina. In regenerating neural cells, neurite promoting factors play a role in adhesion of the axon and include neural cell adhesion molecule (N-CAM) and N-cadherin.

== Treatment ==
Unless otherwise demonstrated, nerve injuries are commonly irreversible, and therefore complete treatment is rather difficult, though still possible and hence lifelong management of disabilities arising due to nerve injuries is necessary.

=== Nerve regeneration therapies ===
Electrical stimulation can promote nerve regeneration. The positive effect of electrical stimulation on nerve regeneration is due to its molecular influence on the damaged neuron and Schwann cells. Electrical stimulation can directly accelerate the expression of cyclic adenosine monophosphate (cAMP) both in neurons and Schwann cells. cAMP is a molecule that stimulates multiple signaling pathways that aid nerve regeneration by enhancing the expression of neurotrophic factors. Electrical stimulation also results in the influx of calcium ions, which further triggers multiple regeneration pathways.

The frequency of stimulation is an important factor in the success of both quality and quantity of axon regeneration as well as growth of the surrounding myelin and blood vessels that support the axon. Histological analysis and measurement of regeneration showed that low frequency stimulation had a more successful outcome than high frequency stimulation on regeneration of damaged sciatic nerves.

Other studies have used both oscillating current (AC) and non-oscillating direct current (DC) stimulation to regenerate mammalian nerves. Mammalian neurons preferentially orient and grow towards the cathode in DC electric fields.

Electrical stimulation can further be used as a diagnostic and prognostic tool following nerve injury. Intraoperative stimulation has been employed a prognostic tool in people undergoing neurolysis surgery following nerve injury, where lower stimulation thresholds are associated with better postoperative motor recovery, whereas absent responses are associated with poor motor recovery, potentially warranting additional surgical interventions.

Surgery can be done in case a nerve has become cut or otherwise divided, as well as when no recovery is achieved many months after injury. Recovery of a nerve after surgical repair depends mainly on the age of patients. Younger people fare better for prognosis due to the healing capacity of young tissues. Young children can recover almost normal nerve function. In contrast, a person over 60 years old with a cut nerve in the hand would expect to recover only protective sensory function, that is, the ability to distinguish hot/cold or sharp/dull; recovery of motor function would be likely incomplete. Many other factors also affect nerve recovery.

An expanding area of nerve regeneration research deals with the development of scaffolding and bio-conduits. Scaffolding developed from bio-compatible material would be useful in nerve regeneration if they successfully exhibit essentially the same role as the endoneurial tubes, Schwann cells and epineurial fibroblasts do in guiding regrowing axons.

== Prevention of nerve injuries ==
Methods to help prevent nerve injuries include injection pressure monitoring. The presence of a high opening injection pressure (> 20 PSI) is a sensitive sign of intrafascicular/intraneural needle tip placement. Extrafascicular needle tip placement is associated with low pressures (< 20 PSI). Also, high pressure injection was associated with neurologic deficits and severe axonal damage after the block. Other methods of preventing nerve injury include electrical nerve stimulation and ultrasonography. Electrical stimulation with a motor response at < 0.2 mA only can occur with an intraneural/intrafasciular needle tip location.

== See also ==
- Brain injury
