= Reinnervation =

Restoration of nerves

Reinnervation is the restoration—either by spontaneous cellular regeneration or by surgical reconstruction—of nerve supply to a body part from which it has been lost or damaged.

== Overview ==
Loss of innervation (denervation) may follow traumatic injury to a peripheral nerve, compression, ischemia, or diseases of motor neurons and neuromuscular junctions. Reinnervation seeks to restore neural input to target organs (most commonly skeletal muscle and skin) to recover motor and sensory function and prevent secondary changes such as muscle atrophy and pain. Reinnervation may occur spontaneously through axonal regrowth and collateral sprouting, or be facilitated surgically by direct nerve repair, nerve grafts, or nerve transfers.

== Biology and mechanisms ==
Following peripheral nerve injury, Wallerian degeneration clears distal axon and myelin, while denervated Schwann cells proliferate and form bands of Büngner that guide regenerating axons toward their targets. Proximal axons sprout growth cones that extend at ~1–3 mm/day under favorable conditions, influenced by neurotrophic factors, extracellular matrix, and mechanical cues. At the target, neuromuscular junctions (NMJs) can be re‑established, although prolonged denervation leads to partial loss of synaptic architecture and declining receptivity of muscle to reinnervation.

Spontaneous reinnervation also occurs by collateral sprouting, in which intact neighboring motor axons reinnervate denervated muscle fibers, enlarging motor units. This mechanism underlies partial functional recovery in some neuropathies and contributes to motor unit remodeling seen on electromyography (EMG).

== Clinical indications ==
Reinnervation strategies are applied in traumatic lacerations and avulsions (e.g., brachial plexus injuries), compressive neuropathies with axonal loss, iatrogenic injuries, and reconstructive scenarios after tumor resection. In motor neuron diseases, surviving motor neurons can partially reinnervate denervated muscles via collateral sprouting, delaying weakness; however, progressive neuron loss eventually outpaces reinnervation capacity.

== Surgical approaches ==
=== Primary repair and grafting ===
When tension‑free coaptation is possible, transected nerves are repaired directly (epineurial or perineurial neurorrhaphy). For segmental defects, interposition grafts (usually autologous sural nerve) bridge gaps; processed acellular nerve allografts and conduits may be considered for short gaps with lower demands.

=== Nerve transfers ===
Nerve transfers route a redundant or less critical donor fascicle/nerve to the distal stump of an injured nerve to shorten the regeneration distance and hasten end‑organ reinnervation. They are central in modern reconstruction of brachial plexus and complex peripheral nerve injuries, and increasingly in central lesions such as cervical spinal cord injury (SCI). Examples include median‑to‑radial motor transfers for wrist/finger extension, and the Oberlin ulnar‑to‑musculocutaneous fascicular transfer for elbow flexion.

=== End‑to‑side (ETS) and supercharged end‑to‑side (SETS) techniques ===
In ETS neurorrhaphy, a distal stump is coapted to the side of an intact donor nerve, enabling collateral sprouting without transecting the donor. Evidence supports selected sensory and some motor indications, though outcomes vary. In SETS, an additional donor fascicle is coapted ETS to augment axon numbers and speed reinnervation while native proximal regeneration continues.

=== Targeted muscle reinnervation (TMR) and related procedures ===
Targeted muscle reinnervation (TMR) transfers residual peripheral nerves to denervated target muscles to provide intuitive myoelectric control signals for advanced prostheses and to reduce neuroma and phantom limb pain. It is used after major limb amputation and, in modified forms (e.g., targeted sensory reinnervation), to restore sensation to the prosthetic interface.

== Factors influencing outcomes ==
Outcome depends on patient age, time from injury to repair, gap length, level of injury (distance to target), quality of the distal bed (Schwann‑cell support), and donor–recipient axon matching. Delays beyond months can compromise motor end‑plates and reduce the potential for functional recovery, motivating early reconstruction or distal nerve transfers to shorten regeneration distance.

== Assessment of reinnervation ==
Recovery is monitored clinically (Tinel sign progression, muscle strength, sensory thresholds) and with neurophysiology and imaging. EMG shows fibrillation potentials after denervation and motor unit reappearance with reinnervation; compound muscle action potential (CMAP) amplitude and motor unit number estimates (MUNE) track reinnervation quantitatively. Imaging (high‑resolution ultrasound, MR neurography) may aid in assessing continuity and neuroma formation. In research, standardized behavioral and histological assays are used to quantify axon counts, myelination, and target organ reinnervation.

== Applications in spinal cord injury ==
In cervical SCI, peripheral nerve transfers can reinnervate distal muscles below the level of the lesion by harnessing intact proximal motor pools, improving grasp and reach in tetraplegia. Algorithms select donors with preserved upper motor neuron input and target lower motor neuron pools in the periphery.

== Complications and limitations ==
Axonal misdirection, mismatched motor‑sensory reinnervation, synkinesis, donor‑site deficits in transfers, neuroma formation, and central maladaptation can limit outcomes. Chronic denervation leads to muscle fibrosis and fatty infiltration, narrowing the therapeutic window for meaningful motor recovery.

== History ==
Experimental work on nerve repair and regeneration dates to the 19th and early 20th centuries; techniques evolved from epineurial suturing to fascicular repair, interposition grafting (popularized in the mid‑20th century), and modern nerve transfer concepts and targeted reinnervation developed in the late 20th and early 21st centuries.

== See also ==
- Denervation
- Neuroregeneration
