= Nerve injury classification =

Scheme developed by Seddon and Sunderland

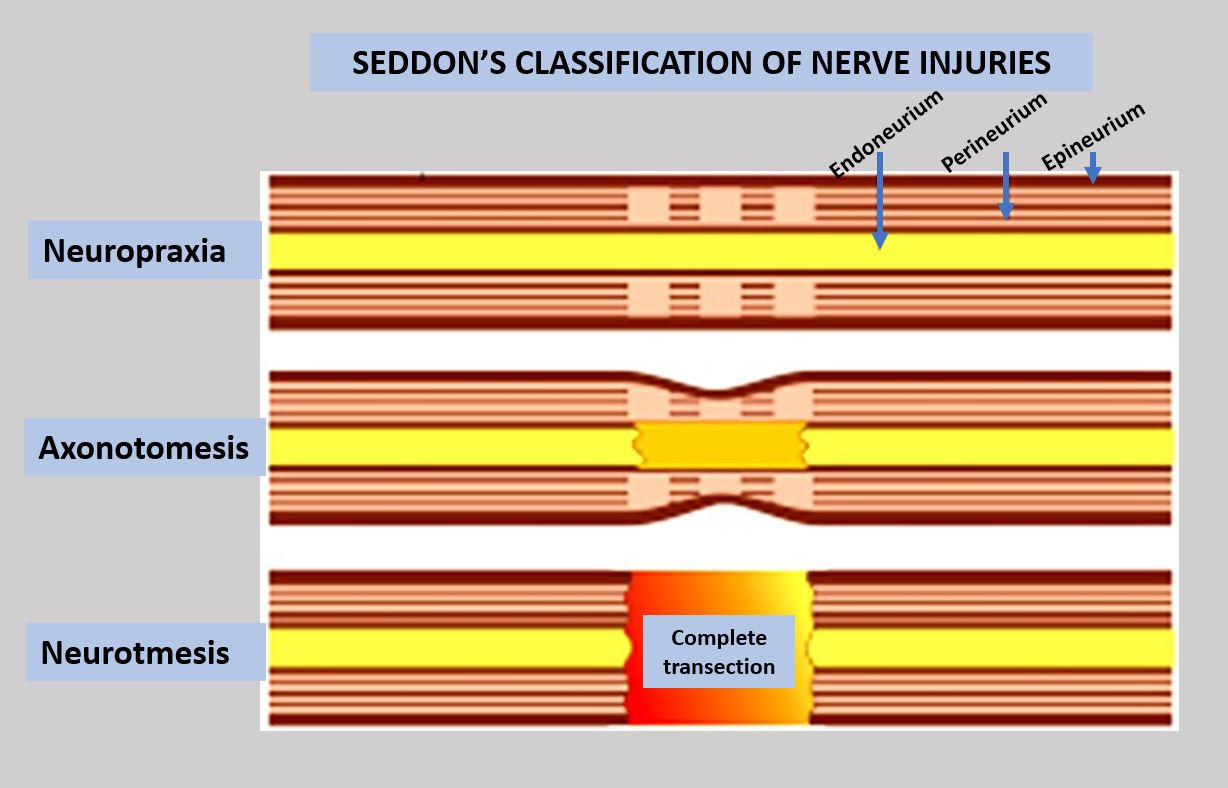
Seddon's classification of nerve injuries

Nerve injury classification assists in prognosis and determination of treatment strategy for nerve injuries. The classification was described by Seddon in 1943 and by Sunderland in 1951. In the lowest degree of nerve injury the nerve remains intact, but signaling ability is damaged, termed neurapraxia. In the second degree the axon is damaged, but the surrounding connecting tissue remains intact – axonotmesis. The last degree, in which both the axon and connective tissue are damaged, is called neurotmesis.

== Seddon's classification ==
In 1943, Seddon described three basic types of nerve injury:

=== Neurapraxia (Class I) ===
Neurapraxia is a temporary interruption of conduction without loss of axonal continuity.^{[2]} Neurapraxia involves a physiologic block of nerve conduction in the affected axons. Neurapraxia is commonly caused by focal demyelination or ischemia, and is a result of damage to the myelin sheath of the nerves. With this injury, the connective tissue structures of the nerve are preserved and the axon remains intact. This injury is generally associated with a favorable prognosis and recovery has occurred within weeks to months.

Other characteristics:

- mildest type of nerve injury
- sensory-motor problems present distal to the site of injury, due to a nerve signal conduction block
- intact endoneurium, perineurium, and the epineurium
- wallerian degeneration not present
- intact conduction in the distal and proximal segments, but no conduction across the injury
- full nerve conduction recovery, requiring days to weeks
- fibrillation potentials (FP) lacking, and positive sharp EMG waves.

=== Axonotmesis (Class II) ===
Axonotmesis are a range of peripheral nerve injuries that are considered more severe than Neurapraxia and less severe than Neurotmesis. Axonotmesis involves loss of relative axon continuity and myelin covering, but preservation of the connective tissue framework (including encapsulating tissue, the epineurium and perineurium). Since connective tissue framework is preserved then axonal regeneration is possible, but recovery is slower.

Other characteristics:

- distal Wallerian degeneration
- distal sensory and motor deficits
- nerve conduction distal to the site of injury (3 to 4 days after injury) absent
- fibrillation potentials (FP), and positive, sharp EMG waves (2 to 3 weeks post injury).
- axonal regeneration and recovery does not typically require surgical treatment, although surgical intervention may be required, due to scar tissue

=== Neurotmesis (Class III) ===
Neurotmesis is total severance/disruption of the nerve fiber. Axon, endo-, peri-, and epineurium transected. Neurotmesis will result in complete sensory and motor deficits in the affected area.

Other characteristics:

- distal Wallerian degeneration
- partial or complete connective tissue lesion
- severe sensory-motor problems and autonomic function defect
- nerve conduction distal to the site of injury absent (3 to 4 days after lesion)
- no distal conduction (EMG and NCV (nerve conduction velocity)
- surgical intervention is necessary to restore function due to the full disruption of the nerve and connective tissue structures.

== Sunderland's classification ==
In 1951, Sunderland expanded Seddon's classification to five degrees. The first two are the same as Seddon's. With each degree, the severity of the injury increases and has larger structural disruption and poorer prognosis.

Sunderland's third-degree and fourth-degree are included within Seddon's axonotmensis. Sunderland's third-degree is nerve fiber interruption. This includes an endoneurium lesion with disruption of the axon and endoneurium, but an intact epineurium and perineurium. Recovery from a third-degree injury may require surgical intervention due to misdirected regeneration that is caused by endoneurial damage. In fourth-degree injury, only the epineurium remain intact, and a complete block to axonal regeneration could occur, requiring surgical repair.

Sunderland's fifth-degree is included within Seddon's neurotmesis. Fifth-degree lesion is a complete transection of the nerve, including the epineurium. Recovery requires appropriate surgical treatment since there is no spontaneous recovery expected.

== Neuroclasis classification ==
In 2025, Schroen et al. proposed a novel classification for nerve stretch injuries based on the distinct mechanical and structural failure pattern of stretch injuries compared to other injury mechanisms.

Using a rat median nerve injury model, the authors found that peripheral nerves fail along an outside-in sequence of structural damage with two distinct degrees of in-continuity stretch injury. The first event of mechanical failure, called Epineuroclasis, causes disruption of the epineurium, exposing the overall intact endoneurial core. The second event of mechanical failure, Endoneuroclasis, is associated with severe endoneurial tube disorganization and vascular disruption despite macroscopic nerve continuity.

Functional recovery is expected after Epineuroclasis, whereas Endoneuroclasis injury results in long-term dysfunction and formation of traumatic in-continuity neuromas.

== Wallerian Degeneration ==
Main article: Wallerian degeneration

Wallerian degeneration is a process that occurs after axonal injury. This is specifically in cases of axonotmesis and neurotmesis. It represents an innate immune response within the peripheral nervous system which is essential for preparation of regeneration. After the injury, the distal portion of the axon undergoes fragmentation, typically beginning within the first 1-2 days, this is then followed by disintegration of an axon and its myelin sheath. Schwann cells and macrophages play essential roles in this process by clearing axonal and myelin debris through phagocytosis; this is a process that occurs within 7 days and is completed within two weeks. This immune mediated response is essential for regeneration because myelin contains molecules that inhibit axonal regeneration. Schwann cells also contribute by releasing cytokines and chemokines that recruit macrophages and promote a regenerative environment. This is a process that allows regenerating axons to grow along pathways that are formed by Schwann cells. Efficient Wallerian degeneration is necessary for functional recovery, impaired or delayed immune responses can ultimately result in reduced regeneration and poorer clinical outcomes.

== See also ==
- Nerve
- Nerve fiber
- Peripheral nerve injury (Nerve injury)
- Connective tissue in the peripheral nervous system
- Neuroregeneration
- Wallerian degeneration
