= Axonotmesis =

Injury to the peripheral nerve of one of the extremities of the body

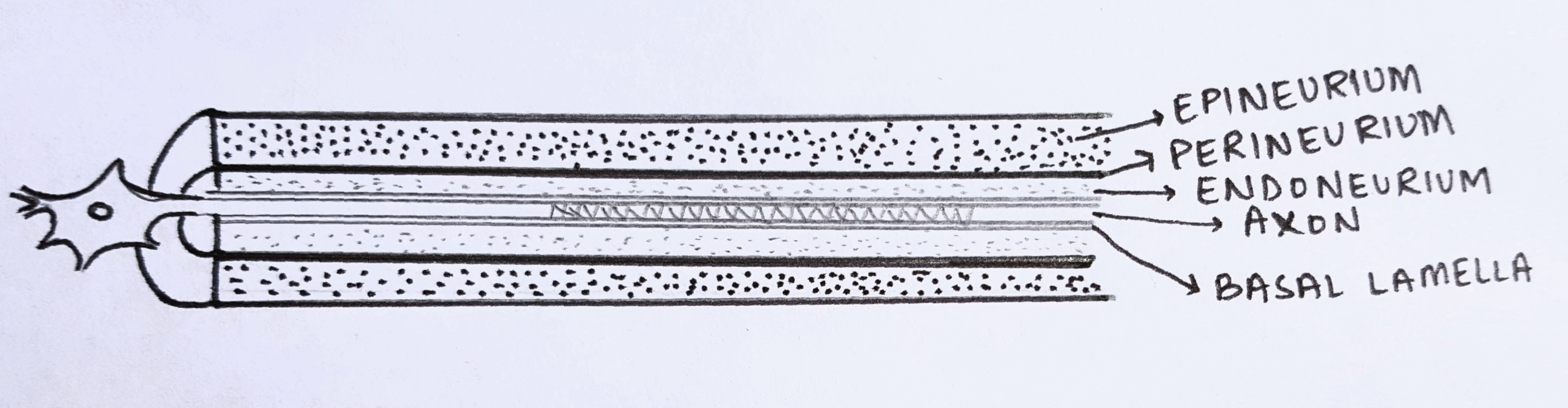
Axonotmesis of the nerve

Axonotmesis is an injury to the peripheral nerve of one of the extremities of the body. The axons and their myelin sheath are damaged in this kind of injury, but the endoneurium, perineurium and epineurium remain intact. Motor and sensory functions distal to the point of injury are completely lost over time leading to Wallerian degeneration due to ischemia, or loss of blood supply. Axonotmesis is usually the result of a more severe crush or contusion than neurapraxia.

Axonotmesis mainly follows a stretch injury. These stretch injuries can either dislocate joints or fracture a limb, due to which peripheral nerves are severed. If the sharp pain from the exposed axon of the nerve is not observed, one can identify a nerve injury from abnormal sensations in their limb. A nerve conduction velocity (NCV) is done to diagnose the issue. Electromyography is performed after 3 to 4 weeks of injury shows signs of denervations and fibrillations, or irregular connections and contractions of muscles.

== Injury classification ==
There are two kinds of nerve injury classifications:

Seddon	Sunderland	Endoneurial tube	Perineurium	Epineurium	Notes
Neurapraxia	Grade I				
Axonotmesis	Grade II	Intact			Emergence of Wallerian degeneration; Detectable with Tinel's sign
Neurotmesis	Grade III	Damaged	Intact		Scarring; Intrafascicular fibrosis occurs due to edema
Neurotmesis	Grade IV		Damaged	Intact	Neuroma could occur; Surgery is required for treatment
Neurotmesis	Grade V				

== Assessment ==
A nerve contains sensory fibers, motor fibers, or both. Sensory fibers lesions cause the sensory problems below to the site of injury. Motor fibers injuries may involve lower motor neurons, sympathetic fibers, and or both.

Assessment items include:

- Sensory fibers that send sensory information to the central nervous system.
- Motor fibers that allow movement of skeletal muscle.
- Sympathetic fibers that innervate the skin and blood vessels.

In assessment, sensory-motor defects may be mild, moderate, or severe. Damage to motor fibers results in paralysis of the muscles. Nervous plexus injuries create more signs and symptoms from sensory-motor problems (such as brachial plexus injuries). In these cases, the prognosis depends on the amount of damage and the degree of functional impairment.

== EMG and NCV findings ==
=== Changes in EMG ===
Electromyography (EMG) is a medical test performed to evaluate and record the electrical activity (electromyogram) produced by skeletal muscles using an instrument called electromyograph. In axonotmesis, EMG changes (2 to 3 weeks after injury) in the denervated muscles include:

1. Fibrillation potentials (FP)
2. Positive sharp waves

=== Changes in NCV (nerve conduction velocity) ===
EMG test is often performed together with another test called nerve conduction study, which measures the conducting function of nerves. NCV study shows loss of nerve conduction in the distal segment (3 to 4 days after injury). According to NCV study, in axonotmesis there is an absence of distal sensory-motor responses.

== Treatment ==
Schwann cells provide the nerve with protection through the production of nerve growth factors. Because these cells are intact, this kind of nerve injury can be cured and normal feeling and sensations can be restored. Surgery can be done in order to help the nerve heal. The surgery will help with nerve regeneration, providing guidance to the nerve sprouts on where to attach on the proximal side of the injury. Damaged nerve axons can reattach themselves after surgery. Treatment of axonotmesis also consists of:

- Physical therapy or occupational therapy. The aims include:
  - Pain relief
  - Maintain range of motion
  - Reducing muscular atrophy
  - Patient education
- Use of assistive devices (orthotic needs)

== Prognosis ==
The prognosis is usually good in terms of recovery. Rate of recovery depends on the distance from the site of injury, and axonal regeneration can go up to 1 inch per month. Complete recovery can take anywhere from 6 months to a year.

== See also ==
- Connective tissue in the peripheral nervous system
- Nerve
- Nerve fiber
- Nerve injury
- Neurapraxia
- Neuroregeneration
- Neurotmesis
- Peripheral nerve injury
- Seddon's classification
- Wallerian degeneration
