= Neurotmesis =

Nerve damaging injury

Neurotmesis (in Greek tmesis signifies "to cut") is a complete transection of a peripheral nerve, and is part of Seddon's classification scheme used to classify nerve damage. It is the most serious nerve injury in the scheme. In this type of injury, both the nerve and the nerve sheath are disrupted. While partial recovery may occur, complete recovery is impossible.

== Symptoms ==
Symptoms of neurotmesis include but are not limited to pain, dysesthesias (uncomfortable sensations), and complete loss of sensory and motor function of the affected nerve.

== Anatomy ==
Neurotmesis occurs in the peripheral nervous system and most often in the upper-limb (arms), accounting for 73.5% of all peripheral nerve injury cases. Of these cases, the ulnar nerve was most often injured. Peripheral nerves are structured so that the axons are surrounded by a myelinated sheath and then an endoneurium. A perineurium surrounds that and the outermost layer is considered the epineurium. When injury occurs, "local vascular trauma leads to hemorrhage and edema (swelling), which results in vigorous inflammatory response resulting in scarring of the injured segment. Within 30 minutes after injury, intracellular processes that promote repair and regeneration have already been activated. Schwann cells play an indispensable role in promoting regeneration by producing neurotrophic factors and by increasing their synthesis of surface cell adhesion molecules, and by elaborating basement membrane containing extracellular matrix proteins, such as laminin and fibronectin. In most cases, due to the extreme nature of the injury, there is typically complete loss of function.

== Mechanisms ==
Trauma is the most frequent cause of peripheral nerve lesions. There are two classifications of trauma which include civilian trauma and military trauma. Civilian trauma is most commonly caused by motor vehicle accidents but also by lacerations caused by glass, knives, fans, saw blades or fractures and occasionally sports injuries. Of the civilian injuries, stretch injuries are the most common types and are considered to be a closed injury, where the tissue is unexposed. Stretch injures are commonly the result of dislocation, such as a shoulder dislocation that stretches nerves. Opposite of civilian trauma, there is military trauma which most commonly results in open injuries from blasts often by bombs or improvised explosive devices. Other mechanisms of injury are less common but include ischemia, thermal, electric shock, radiation, adverse reactions to certain chemotherapy medications, percussion and vibration.

== Diagnosis ==
With Seddon's classification of nerve injuries, it is often tough to identify whether a particular nerve injury is neurotmesis, or axonotmesis, which has damage to the nerve fibres but preservation of the nerve trunk. Due to the damage involved in both of these conditions they will both show paralysis of muscles that are supplied by nerves below the site of the lesion, and will have sensory deficits in accordance with the individual nerves that are damaged. The only way to know for sure if a nerve injury is in fact neurotmesis is to allow for the normal progression of nerve regeneration to take place (nerves regenerate at a rate of approximately 2–4 mm/day proximal to the lesion), and if, after that time, there is still profound muscle paralysis and degeneration in these areas, then it is likely to have been a neurotmesis injury.

Neurotmesis is diagnosed through clinical evaluation of symptoms, physical evaluation, and other diagnostic studies. Patients often undergo a series of muscle strength tests, sensory exam which includes feeling the sensation of light touch, pinprick, vibration, and others. Other tests involved with diagnosis of nerve injury are electromyography (EMG) and nerve conduction studies (NCS). These help to distinguish upper from lower motor neuron disorder as well as diagnose primary muscle disease.

=== Classification ===
Peripheral nerve injuries can be classified in two different ways. Neurotmesis is classified under the Seddon system which is defined by three grades of nerve injury. The mildest grade is referred to as neurapraxia and is characterized by a reduction or complete blockage of conduction across a segment of nerve while axonal continuity is maintained and nerve conduction is preserved. These injuries are almost always reversed and a recovery takes place within days or weeks. The second classification of the Seddon system is referred to as axonotmesis which is a more severe case of peripheral nerve injury. Axonotmesis is classified by an interruption of the axons, but a preservation of the surrounding connective tissues around the axon. These injuries can heal themselves at about 1mm/day, therefore resulting in recovery to be possible but at a slower rate than neurapraxia. The last and most severe case of peripheral nerve injury is known as neurotmesis, which in most cases cannot be completely recovered from even with surgical repair.

The second classification of nerve injury is known as the Sunderland classification which is more complex and specific. This classification uses five different degrees of nerve injury, the first one being the least severe and the equivalent to neurapraxia and the most severe being the fifth degree and having the same classification as neurotmesis. The second through fourth degrees are dependent on the variance of axon discontinuity and are classified under Seddon's classification of axonotmesis.

== Treatment ==
The first line of treatment is often to treat the patient's pain with neuropathic drugs such as tricyclic antidepressants, Serotonin–norepinephrine reuptake inhibitor, and anticonvulsants. The second lines of drugs to treat pain are non-steroidal anti-inflammatories, tramadol, and opioids. Other techniques used to facilitate healing of the nerve and pain are either static or dynamic splinting that can both help protect the injured part as well as improve function. Sometimes surgery is an option, although the prognosis is still very poor of regaining function of the affected nerve. The goal of surgery is to join healthy nerve to unhealthy nerve. The most common surgical techniques include external neurolysis, end-to-end repair, nerve grafting, and nerve transfer from somewhere else in the body.

== Prognosis ==
People with neurotmesis often face a poor prognosis. They will more than likely never regain full functionality of the affected nerve, but surgical techniques do give people a better chance at regaining some function. Current research is focused on new ways to regenerate nerves and advance surgical techniques.

== See also ==
- Nerve injury
- Neuroregeneration
- Wallerian degeneration
