= Neurapraxia =

Neuropraxia
- Other names: Neurapraxia
- Specialty: Neurology

Neurapraxia is a disorder of the peripheral nervous system in which there is a temporary loss of motor and sensory function due to blockage of nerve conduction, usually lasting an average of six to eight weeks before full recovery. Neurapraxia is derived from the word apraxia, meaning “loss or impairment of the ability to execute complex coordinated movements without muscular or sensory impairment”.

This condition is typically caused by a blunt neural injury due to external blows or shock-like injuries to muscle fibers and skeletal nerve fibers, which leads to repeated or prolonged pressure buildup on the nerve. As a result of this pressure, ischemia occurs, a neural lesion results, and the human body naturally responds with edema extending in all directions from the source of the pressure. This lesion causes a complete or partial action potential conduction block over a segment of a nerve fiber and thus a reduction or loss of function in parts of the neural connection downstream from the lesion, leading to muscle weakness.

Neurapraxia results in temporary damage to the myelin sheath but leaves the nerve intact and is an impermanent condition; thus, Wallerian degeneration does not occur in neurapraxia. In order for the condition to be considered neurapraxia, according to the Seddon classification system of peripheral nerve injury, there must be a complete and relatively rapid recovery of motor and sensory function once nerve conduction has been restored; otherwise, the injury would be classified as axonotmesis or neurotmesis. Thus, neurapraxia is the mildest classification of peripheral nerve injury.

Neurapraxia is very common in professional athletes, especially American football players, and is a condition that can and should be treated by a physician.

== Signs and symptoms ==
A variety of nerve types can be subjected to neurapraxia and therefore symptoms of the injury range in degree and intensity. Common symptoms of neurapraxia are disturbances in sensation, weakness of muscle, vasomotor and sudomotor paralysis in the region of the affected nerve or nerves, and abnormal sensitivity of the nerve at the point of injury. It has been observed that subjective sensory symptoms include numbness, tingling, and burning sensations at the site of the injury. Objective sensory symptoms are generally minimal in regards to touch, pain, heat, and cold. In cases of motor neuron neurapraxia, symptoms consist of flaccid paralysis of the muscles innervated by the injured nerve or nerves. Symptoms are often transient and only last for a short period of time immediately following the injury. However, in severe cases of neurapraxia, symptoms can persist for weeks or months at a time.

== Causes ==
The cause of neurapraxia is a neural lesion which causes a temporary block of nerve conduction without transection of the axon. A conduction block is classified as a 40% reduction in action potential amplitude over a short distance on the nerve, or a 50% reduction for a longer distance on the nerve. In neurapraxia, stimulation to the injured nerve results in a greater reduction in the action potential amplitude on the proximal site of the injury as opposed to the distal site.

== Anatomy ==
Neurapraxia occurs in the peripheral nervous system typically in the ulnar, median, and radial nerves of the upper body and in the sciatic and peroneal nerves of the lower body. Peripheral nerves are myelinated, relatively large, spatially complex cells whose size and connectivity typically make them more susceptible to damage and compromise their capacity to self-repair, although this is not the case in neurapraxia. Microscopic evidence has shown that there is damage to the myelin sheath, but not to the axon. Therefore, distal nerve fibers do not degenerate and the myelin damage can be repaired.

=== Order of pathology ===
The order of pathology within the first 24 hours after injury follows a general pattern of nerve injury. The first physical manifestation of the injury is focal swelling adjacent to the site of the injury. In the cellular dimension, a fragmentation of neurotubules and neurofilaments occurs as a result of pressure exerted on the nerve. Axons swell at some sites and are compressed at others, leading to a beaded appearance.

=== Mechanisms of injury ===
There are several mechanisms of nerve injury including mechanical lesions, ischemia, immunologic attack, metabolic disorder, toxic agents, and exposure to radiation. The most common mechanism of injury is nerve compression in which external pressure causes decreased blood flow to the nerve and deformation of the nerve fibers. Repeated or prolonged compression of the nerve results in ischemia and ultimately edema above and below the source of the pressure (I). The thinning of myelin sheaths or focal demyelination are the main consequences of the injury that lead to conduction blockage.

== Diagnosis ==
=== Seddon classification ===
There are three distinct classifications and degrees of nerve injury:

- Neurotmesis is the most serious degree of nerve injury. It involves the disruption of the nerve and the nerve sheath.
- Axonotmesis occurs when the majority of the supporting structures of the nerve are preserved, but disruption of the nerve fibers is still observed. Wallerian degeneration often occurs in the near the proximity of the injury site.
- Neurapraxia is least serious form of nerve injury.

There are two different forms of mechanical nerve injury involving neurapraxia. The underlying causes of transient nerve injury typically include a brief ischemic episode or any form of compression. More persistent forms of nerve injury involve demyelination and axonal constriction. In certain circumstances, diagnosing neurapraxia can be uncomfortable because of the presence of severe neuropathic pain. Neuropathic pain is an indication that the lesion of the nerve is still in progress. Diagnosis of neurapraxia is almost always followed by a quick and complete recovery period.

== Treatment and recovery ==
The entire nerve is involved in the response to traumatic injuries. The outcome of nerve repair is dependent on the degree of the nerve injury and the circumstances at the site of injury. Since neurapraxia is the least serious form of peripheral nerve injury, recovery and treatment are not extensive. Once the cause of neurapraxia is eliminated, recovery of the lesions in the nerve occurs within a short time span.

=== Non-operative treatment ===
Neurapraxia is often treated and cured by non-operative means. The primary goals of treatment are to maintain the proper nutrition of the paralyzed muscles, prevent contraction by the antagonists of the paralyzed muscles, and to consistently keep the joints mobile. A splint is often used in cases of neurapraxia because it is able to maintain a relaxed position of the paralyzed muscle. The splint prevents the paralyzed muscle from being overstretched either by the force of gravity or by other non-paralyzed antagonists. During the recovery period of neurapraxia, it is essential that the joints constantly undergo passive movement in order to preserve proper mobility. If joints are kept mobile, the limb has the best possible chance of benefit from the return of nervous function. Non-steroidal anti-inflammatory medications can also help to reduce swelling at the injury site. In addition to these non-operative remedies, it is suggested that muscles affected by neurapraxia be kept warm at all times. Circulation in the limb is stimulated with the use of heat. Once voluntary movement has returned to the muscle, recovery and treatment continues by the participation in active exercises. Physical Therapy and Occupational Therapy are common sources of treatment during these early stages of restoration of active movement. Almost all cases of neurapraxia can be completely treated by non-operative means.

=== Treating cervical cord neurapraxia on the field ===
According to medical professionals with the Cleveland Clinic, once an athlete has an episode of cervical spinal cord neurapraxia, team physician or athletic trainer first stabilize the head and neck followed by a thorough neurologic inspection. If the injury is deemed severe, injured parties should be taken to a hospital for evaluation. Athletes that experience severe episodes of neurapraxia are urged to consult orthopaedic or spinal medical specialists. In mild cases of neurapraxia, the athlete is able to remove themselves from the field of play. However, the athlete is still advised to seek medical consultation.

== Prognosis ==
In cases of neurapraxia, the function of the nerves are temporarily impaired. However, the prognosis for recovery from neurapraxia is efficient and quick. Recovery begins within two to three weeks after the injury occurs, and it is complete within six to eight weeks. There are instances when function is not completely restored until four months after the instance of injury. The recovery period of neurapraxia is not an entirely ordered process, but the recovery is always complete and fast.

== Epidemiology ==
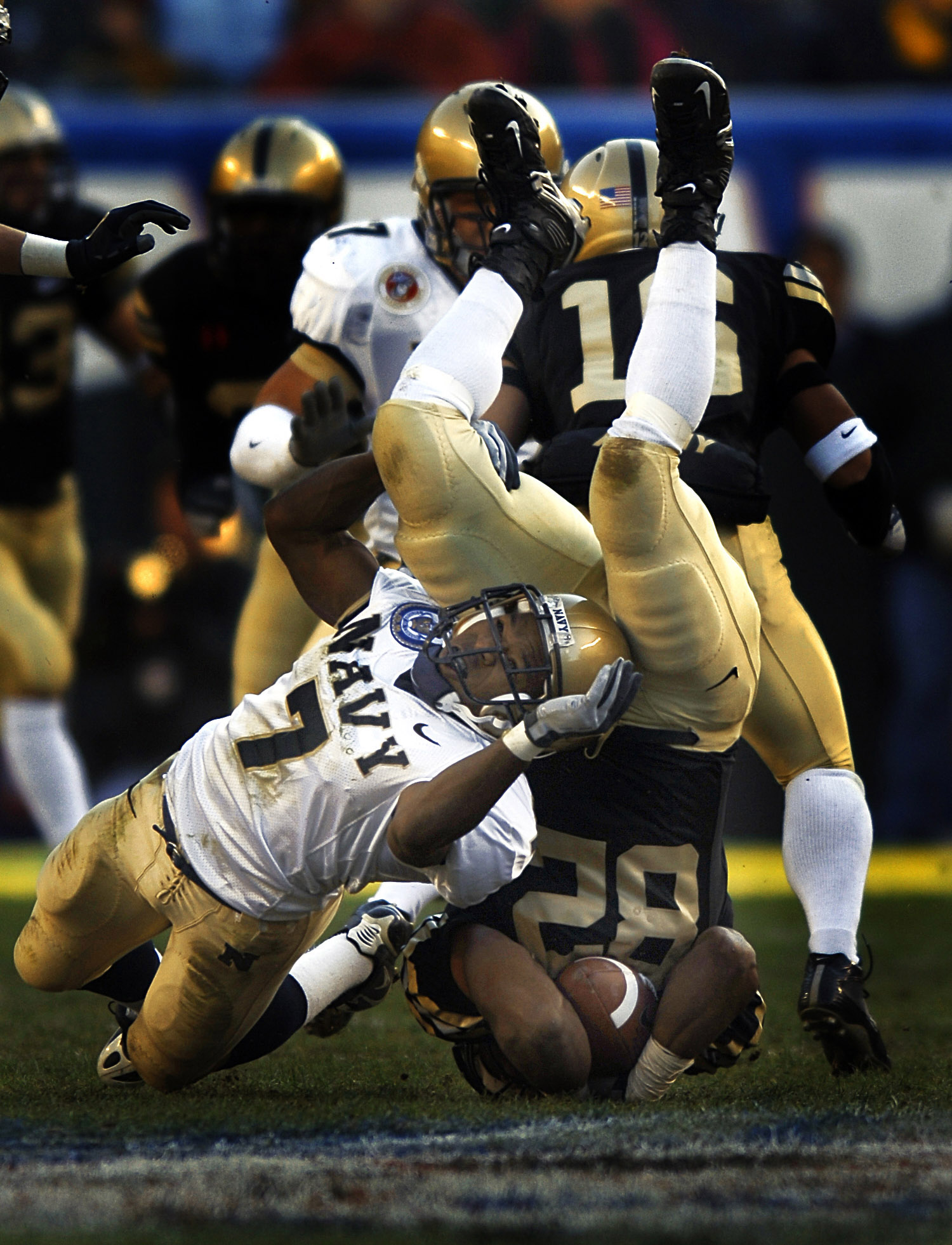
This tackle which occurred during an Army versus Navy game is representative of those that occur in American football. Neurapraxia is a common injury in all levels of football.

Neurapraxia is most commonly observed in athletes involved in collision sports, such as American football. Athletes participating in collision sports most often suffer from cervical cord neurapraxia, also known as transient neurapraxia. Cervical cord neurapraxia is the result of a severe collision in which a blow to the crown of the athlete's head forcefully extends or compresses the neck. Numbness, stinging, and/or weakness in the arms, legs or both, distinguish cervical cord neurapraxia. Typical episodes of transient neurapraxia only last a few seconds and symptoms dissipate entirely. Though the severity of the injury can range, transient neurapraxia does not lead to permanent paralysis of the affected muscles. Subsequent spinal cord injury after an episode of cervical cord neurapraxia has not been observed. However, athletes who experience an episode of transient cervical neurapraxia face an approximately 50% chance of a repeat episode if they continue to participate in collision sports.

=== American football ===
Cervical cord neurapraxia among American football players is commonly observed in athletes playing positions involving high-speed collisions and open-field tackling. Cases of neurapraxia in the National Football League were first described in 1986 by Joseph Torg, M.D., founder of the National Football Head and Neck Injury Registry (established in 1975). As a result of Dr. Torg's findings the NFL as well as other levels of American football have outlawed the act of spearing, or the lowering of the head and hitting an opponent with the crown of the helmet. The cervical spine cannot properly absorb the force of a collision when the head is even slightly lowered as is the case in spearing. In addition to outlawing acts such as spearing, prevention of neurapraxia on the football field relies on instruction and reinforcement of proper tackling technique by coaches and trainers.

== In popular culture ==
In M*A*S*H Season 4 Episode one, Benjamin "Hawkeye" Pierce claims that Walter "Radar" O'Reilly has neurapraxia as an excuse for driving past a military checkpoint. Hawkeye lies about the causes and treatments to keep them from getting into trouble. When questioned by Radar if it was a real disease, he answered "Yes, but only people that bite their nails can get it" (which Radar was currently doing).

== See also ==
- Nerve injury – Damage to nervous tissue
- Neuroregeneration – Renewal or physiological repair of damaged nerve tissue
- Peripheral nerve injury classification – Scheme developed by Seddon and Sunderland
