= Motor neuron diseases =

Group of neurological disorders affecting motor neurons

Motor neuron disease
- Spinal diagram
- Specialty: Neurology

Motor neuron diseases or motor neurone diseases (MNDs) are a group of rare neurodegenerative disorders that selectively affect motor neurons, the cells which control voluntary muscles of the body. They include amyotrophic lateral sclerosis (ALS), progressive bulbar palsy (PBP), pseudobulbar palsy, progressive muscular atrophy (PMA), primary lateral sclerosis (PLS), spinal muscular atrophy (SMA) and monomelic amyotrophy (MMA), as well as some rarer variants resembling ALS.

Motor neuron diseases affect both children and adults. While each motor neuron disease affects patients differently, they all cause movement-related symptoms, mainly muscle weakness. Most of these diseases seem to occur randomly without known causes, but some forms are inherited. Studies into these inherited forms have led to discoveries of various genes (e.g. SOD1) that are thought to be important in understanding how the disease occurs.

Symptoms of motor neuron diseases can be first seen at birth or can come on slowly later in life. Most of these diseases worsen over time; while some, such as ALS, shorten one's life expectancy, others do not. Currently, there are no approved treatments for the majority of motor neuron disorders, and care is mostly symptomatic.

== Signs and symptoms ==
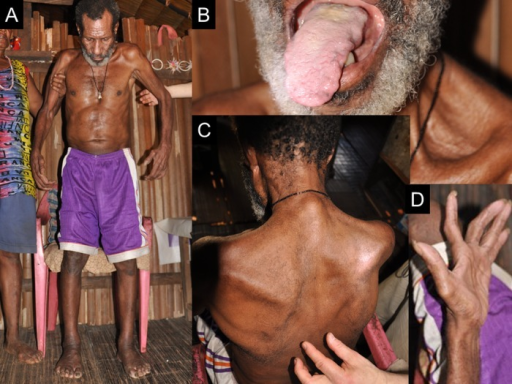
A man with amyotrophic lateral sclerosis (ALS). (A) He needs assistance to stand. (B) Advanced atrophy of the tongue. (C) There is upper limb and truncal muscle atrophy with a positive Babinski sign. (D) Advanced thenar muscle atrophy.

Signs and symptoms depend on the specific disease, but motor neuron diseases typically manifest as a group of movement-related symptoms. They come on slowly, and worsen over the course of more than three months. Various patterns of muscle weakness are seen, and muscle cramps and spasms may occur. One can have difficulty breathing with climbing stairs (exertion), difficulty breathing when lying down (orthopnea), or even respiratory failure if breathing muscles become involved. Bulbar symptoms, including difficulty speaking (dysarthria), difficulty swallowing (dysphagia), and excessive saliva production (sialorrhea), can also occur. Sensation, or the ability to feel, is typically not affected. Emotional disturbance (e.g. pseudobulbar affect) and cognitive and behavioural changes (e.g. problems in word fluency, decision-making, and memory) are also seen. There can be lower motor neuron findings (e.g. muscle wasting, muscle twitching), upper motor neuron findings (e.g. brisk reflexes, Babinski reflex, Hoffman's reflex, increased muscle tone), or both.

Motor neuron diseases are seen both in children and adults. Those that affect children tend to be inherited or familial, and their symptoms are either present at birth or appear before learning to walk. Those that affect adults tend to appear after age 40. The clinical course depends on the specific disease, but most progress or worsen over the course of months. Some are fatal (e.g. ALS), while others are not (e.g. PLS).

=== Patterns of weakness ===
Various patterns of muscle weakness occur in different motor neuron diseases. Weakness can be symmetric or asymmetric, and it can occur in body parts that are distal, proximal, or both. According to Statland et al., there are three main weakness patterns that are seen in motor neuron diseases, which are:

1. Asymmetric distal weakness without sensory loss (e.g. ALS, PLS, PMA, MMA)
2. Symmetric weakness without sensory loss (e.g. PMA, PLS)
3. Symmetric focal midline proximal weakness (neck, trunk, bulbar involvement; e.g. ALS, PBP, PLS)

=== Lower and upper motor neuron findings ===
Motor neuron diseases are on a spectrum in terms of upper and lower motor neuron involvement. Some have just lower or upper motor neuron findings, while others have a mix of both. Lower motor neuron (LMN) findings include muscle atrophy and fasciculations, and upper motor neuron (UMN) findings include hyperreflexia, spasticity, muscle spasm, and abnormal reflexes.

Pure upper motor neuron diseases, or those with just UMN findings, include PLS.

Pure lower motor neuron diseases, or those with just LMN findings, include PMA.

Motor neuron diseases with both UMN and LMN findings include both familial and sporadic ALS.

== Causes ==
Most cases are sporadic and their causes are usually not known. It is thought that environmental, toxic, viral, or genetic factors may be involved.

=== DNA damage ===
TAR DNA-binding protein 43 (TDP-43), is a critical component of the non-homologous end joining (NHEJ) enzymatic pathway that repairs DNA double-strand breaks in pluripotent stem cell-derived motor neurons. TDP-43 is rapidly recruited to double-strand breaks where it acts as a scaffold for the recruitment of the XRCC4-DNA ligase protein complex that then acts to repair double-strand breaks. About 95% of ALS patients have abnormalities in the nucleus-cytoplasmic localization in spinal motor neurons of TDP43. In TDP-43 depleted human neural stem cell-derived motor neurons, as well as in sporadic ALS patients' spinal cord specimens there is significant double-strand break accumulation and reduced levels of NHEJ.

=== Associated risk factors ===
In adults, men are more commonly affected than women.

== Diagnosis ==
Differential diagnosis can be challenging due to the number of overlapping symptoms, shared between several motor neuron diseases. Frequently, the diagnosis is based on clinical findings (i.e. LMN vs. UMN signs and symptoms, patterns of weakness), family history of MND, and a variation of tests, many of which are used to rule out disease mimics, which can manifest with identical symptoms.

=== Classification ===
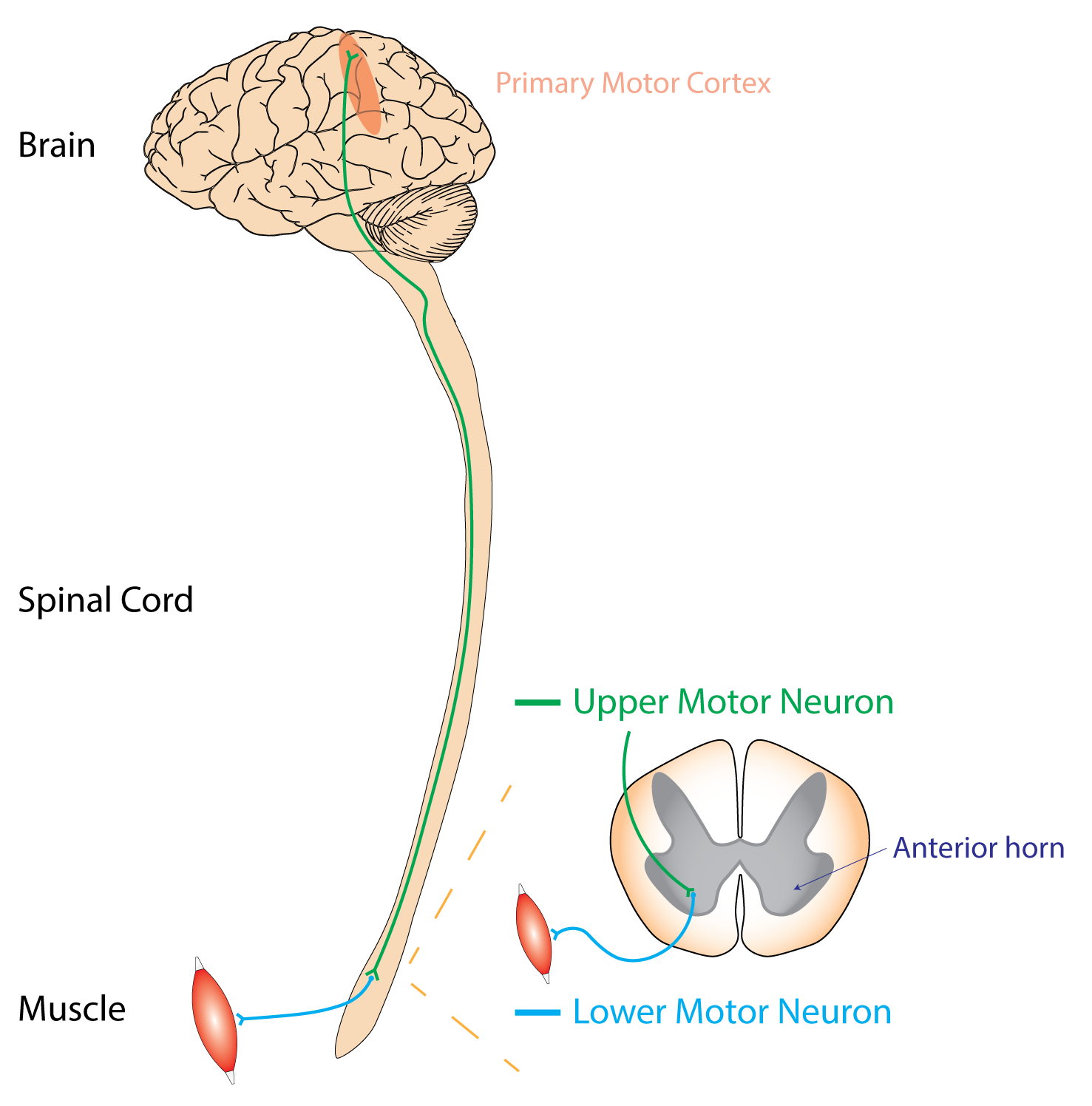
Corticospinal tract. Upper motor neurons originating in the primary motor cortex synapse to either lower motor neurons in the anterior horn of the central gray matter of the spinal cord (insert) or brainstem motor neurons (not shown). Motor neuron disease can affect either upper motor neurons (UMNs) or lower motor neurons (LMNs).

Motor neuron disease describes a collection of clinical disorders, characterized by progressive muscle weakness and the degeneration of the motor neuron on electrophysiological testing. The term "motor neuron disease" has varying meanings in different countries. Similarly, the literature inconsistently classifies which degenerative motor neuron disorders can be included under the umbrella term "motor neuron disease". The four main types of MND are marked (*) in the table below.

All types of MND can be differentiated by two defining characteristics:

1. Is the disease sporadic or inherited?
2. Is there involvement of the upper motor neurons (UMN), the lower motor neurons (LMN), or both?

Sporadic or acquired MNDs occur in patients with no family history of degenerative motor neuron disease. Inherited or genetic MNDs adhere to one of the following inheritance patterns: autosomal dominant, autosomal recessive, or X-linked. Some disorders, like ALS, can occur sporadically (85%) or can have a genetic cause (15%) with the same clinical symptoms and progression of disease.

UMNs are motor neurons that project from the cortex down to the brainstem or spinal cord. LMNs originate in the anterior horns of the spinal cord and synapse on peripheral muscles. Both motor neurons are necessary for the strong contraction of a muscle, but damage to an UMN can be distinguished from damage to a LMN by physical exam.

Type	UMN degeneration	LMN degeneration
Sporadic MNDs
Sporadic amyotrophic lateral sclerosis (ALS)*	Yes	Yes
Primary lateral sclerosis (PLS)*	Yes	No
Progressive muscular atrophy (PMA)*	No	Yes
Progressive bulbar palsy (PBP)*	Yes	Yes, bulbar region
Pseudobulbar palsy	Yes, bulbar region	No
Monomelic amyotrophy (MMA)	No	Yes
Inherited MNDs
Familial amyotrophic lateral sclerosis (ALS)*	Yes	Yes

=== Tests ===
- Cerebrospinal fluid (CSF) tests: Analysis of the fluid from around the brain and spinal cord could reveal signs of an infection or inflammation.
- Magnetic resonance imaging (MRI): An MRI of the brain and spinal cord is recommended in patients with UMN signs and symptoms to explore other causes, such as a tumor, inflammation, or lack of blood supply (stroke).
- Electromyogram (EMG) & nerve conduction study (NCS): The EMG, which evaluates muscle function, and NCS, which evaluates nerve function, are performed together in patients with LMN signs.
- For patients with MND affecting the LMNs, the EMG will show evidence of: (1) acute denervation, which is ongoing as motor neurons degenerate, and (2) chronic denervation and reinnervation of the muscle, as the remaining motor neurons attempt to fill in for lost motor neurons.
- By contrast, the NCS in these patients is usually normal. It can show a low compound muscle action potential (CMAP), which results from the loss of motor neurons, but the sensory neurons should remain unaffected.
- Tissue biopsy: Taking a small sample of a muscle or nerve may be necessary if the EMG/NCS is not specific enough to rule out other causes of progressive muscle weakness, but it is rarely used.

== Treatment ==
There are no known curative treatments for the majority of motor neuron disorders. Physiotherapy helps maintain movement and function when someone is affected by disability, injury or illness. This is achieved through movement and exercise, manual therapy, education and advice. Although physiotherapy cannot reverse the effects of MND, or Kennedy's disease, it can help maintain range of movement and comfort for as long as possible. Active interventions, such as respiratory support when the respiratory muscles weaken and a feeding tube to ensure proper nutrition, may be provided alongside various assistive devices and supportive care services to maintain daily functioning.

Significant advances in molecular medicine have enabled disease-modifying treatments for spinal muscular atrophy (SMA), a hereditary motor neuron disorder caused by mutations in both copies of the SMN1 gene. These mutations result in insufficient production of survival motor neuron (SMN) protein, leading to progressive degeneration of motor neurons and muscle weakness. Onasemnogene abeparvovec (Zolgensma) is a gene therapy administered as a single intravenous infusion, using a modified adeno-associated virus (AAV9) to deliver a functional copy of SMN1 into cells, restoring their ability to produce SMN protein. Two other treatments, nusinersen (Spinraza) and risdiplam (Evrysdi), modify the processing of SMN2 messenger RNA to increase production of functional SMN protein. Clinical studies have demonstrated substantial improvements in survival, respiratory function and motor development, particularly when treatment begins before symptoms appear. Although these therapies cannot restore motor neurons already lost and are not considered cures, they have fundamentally altered the prognosis of SMA, including its most severe infantile forms.

== Prognosis ==
The table below lists life expectancy for patients who are diagnosed with MND.

Type	Median survival time from start of symptoms
Amyotrophic lateral sclerosis (ALS)	2–5 years
Primary lateral sclerosis (PLS)	8–10 years
Progressive muscular atrophy (PMA)	2–4 years
Progressive bulbar palsy (PBP)	6 months – 3 years
Pseudobulbar palsy	No change in survival

== Terminology ==
In the United States and Canada, the term motor neuron disease usually refers to the group of disorders while amyotrophic lateral sclerosis is frequently called Lou Gehrig's disease. In the United Kingdom and Australia, the term motor neuron(e) disease is used for amyotrophic lateral sclerosis, although is not uncommon to refer to the entire group.

While MND refers to a specific subset of similar diseases, there are numerous other diseases of motor neurons that are referred to collectively as "motor neuron disorders", for instance the diseases belonging to the spinal muscular atrophies group. However, they are not classified as "motor neuron diseases" by the 11th edition of the International Statistical Classification of Diseases and Related Health Problems (ICD-11), which is the definition followed in this article.

== See also ==
- Spinal muscular atrophies
- Hereditary motor and sensory neuropathies
- Stephen Hawking
