= Motor unit number estimation =

Motor unit number estimation (MUNE) is a technique that uses electromyography to estimate the number of motor units in a muscle.

== Principles ==
A motor unit consists of one alpha motor neuron and all the muscle fibres it innervates.

Muscles differ in the number of motor units that they contain, and how many muscle fibres are within each unit (innervation ratio). In a general sense, muscles that require specificity of movement, such as muscles in charge of eye movement, have fewer fibres per unit, while those that are meant for less specific tasks, such as the calf muscles in charge of jumping, have more.

MUNE uses a general formula of: Number of motor units = compound muscle action potential size divided by the mean surface-detected motor unit action potential size

The compound muscle action potential (CMAP) size is found using supramaximal stimulation of the motor nerve to the muscle or muscle group (similar to a nerve conduction study). It is recorded using surface electrodes. This is representative of the sum of the surface detected motor unit action potentials from muscles innervated by that nerve.

Surface-detected motor unit action potential (SMUAP) size is the contribution of individual motor units. The way of finding the average size of these action potentials depends on the method used, as described below.

== Methods ==
There are at least six techniques that are currently in use to estimate motor unit numbers. These include incremental stimulation, multi-point stimulation method, F-response method, spike-triggered averaging method and the statistical method. Incremental stimulation is the most illustrative of the concept, and so will be discussed here.

According to Henneman's size principle, motor unit recruitment is orderly such that smaller motor neurons are recruited before progressively larger ones. Additionally, the motor unit action potential is an all-or-none phenomenon - once the recruitment threshold (the stimulus intensity at which a motor unit begins to fire) is reached, it fires fully. Electrical stimulation of nerves reverses the recruitment order, due to the lower resistance of the larger motor neuron axons. Incremental stimulation involves gradually increasing the intensity of the stimulus to reach the recruitment threshold of increasing numbers of motor units until the intensity of the CMAP is reached. A 'step' is noted when an increase in stimulus leads to an increase in recorded EMG (i.e. another motor unit's threshold is reached and it is recruited). The CMAP is then divided by the number of steps required to reach the intensity of the CMAP to get a mean SMUAP size. The number of steps does not correlate to the total number of motor units in the muscle. Instead, the CMAP size is then divided by the mean SMUAP size to get an estimation of the number of motor units in the muscle.

== Uses ==
The number of motor units per muscle can change due to aging, disease, or injury. These techniques are used to diagnose disease or monitor the effects of aging, disease and injury over time. In neuropathies, motoneurons die off, reducing the number of motor units progressively. In myopathies the size of the motor units is reduced because of the death of motor fibres, but the number of motor units remains the same until the disease progresses to a very severe state. In collaboration with other electromyography techniques, these conditions can be diagnosed and monitored. In a similar vein, normal aging also reduces the number of motor units but not to the same degree as disease. The effects of injury depend on the circumstances.
