= Motor unit recruitment =

Additional activation of motor units to increase contractile strength

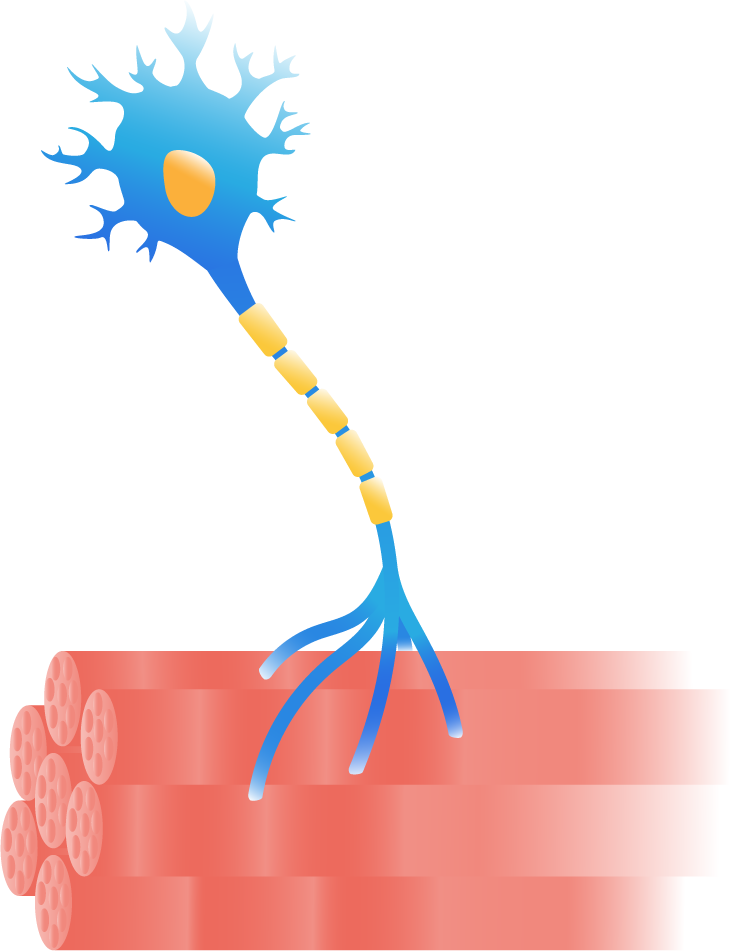
General depiction of a motor unit, consisting of a motor neuron innervating a group of muscle fibers.

Motor unit recruitment is the activation of additional motor units to accomplish an increase in contractile strength in a muscle. A motor unit consists of one motor neuron and all of the muscle fibers it stimulates. All muscles consist of a number of motor units and the fibers belonging to a motor unit are dispersed and intermingle amongst fibers of other units. The muscle fibers belonging to one motor unit can be spread throughout part, or most of the entire muscle, depending on the number of fibers and size of the muscle. When a motor neuron is activated, all of the muscle fibers innervated by the motor neuron are stimulated and contract. The activation of one motor neuron will result in a weak but distributed muscle contraction. The activation of more motor neurons will result in more muscle fibers being activated, and therefore a stronger muscle contraction. Motor unit recruitment is a measure of how many motor neurons are activated in a particular muscle, and therefore is a measure of how many muscle fibers of that muscle are activated. The higher the recruitment the stronger the muscle contraction will be. Motor units are generally recruited in order of smallest to largest (smallest motor neurons to largest motor neurons, and thus slow to fast twitch) as contraction increases. This is known as Henneman's size principle.

== Neuronal mechanism of recruitment ==
Henneman proposed that the mechanism underlying the size principle was that the smaller motor neurons had a smaller surface area and therefore a higher membrane resistance. He predicted that the current generated by an excitatory postsynaptic potential (EPSPs) would result in a higher voltage change (depolarization) across the neuronal membrane of the smaller motor neurons and therefore larger EPSPs in smaller motoneurons. Burke later demonstrated that there was a graded decrease of both EPSP and inhibitory postsynaptic potential (IPSP) amplitudes from small to large motoneurons. This seemed to confirm Henneman's idea, but Burke disagreed, pointing out that larger neurons with a larger surface area had space for more synapses. Burke eventually showed (in a very small sample of neurons) that smaller motoneurons have a greater number of synaptic inputs from a single input source. The topic is probably still regarded as controversial.

In their 1982 paper, Burke and colleagues propose that the small cell size and high surface-to-volume ratio of S motor units allows for greater metabolic activity, optimized for the "highest duty cycles" of motoneurons, while other motor unit types may be involved in "lower duty cycles." However, they state that the evidence is not conclusive "to support or deny the intuitively appealing notion that there is a correlation between metabolic activity, motoneuron size, and motor unit type."

Under some circumstances, the normal order of motor unit recruitment may be altered, such that small motor units cease to fire and larger ones may be recruited. This is thought to be due to the interaction of excitatory and inhibitory motoneuronal inputs.

== Recruitment of motor unit types ==
Another topic of controversy resides in the way in which Burke and colleagues categorized motor unit types. They designated three general groups by which motor units could be categorized: S (slow – slow twitch), FR (fast, resistant – fast twitch, fatigue-resistant), and FF (fast, fatigable – fast twitch, fatigable). These designations have served as the basis for motor unit categorization since their conception, but modern research indicates that human motor units are more complex and possibly do not directly fit this model.

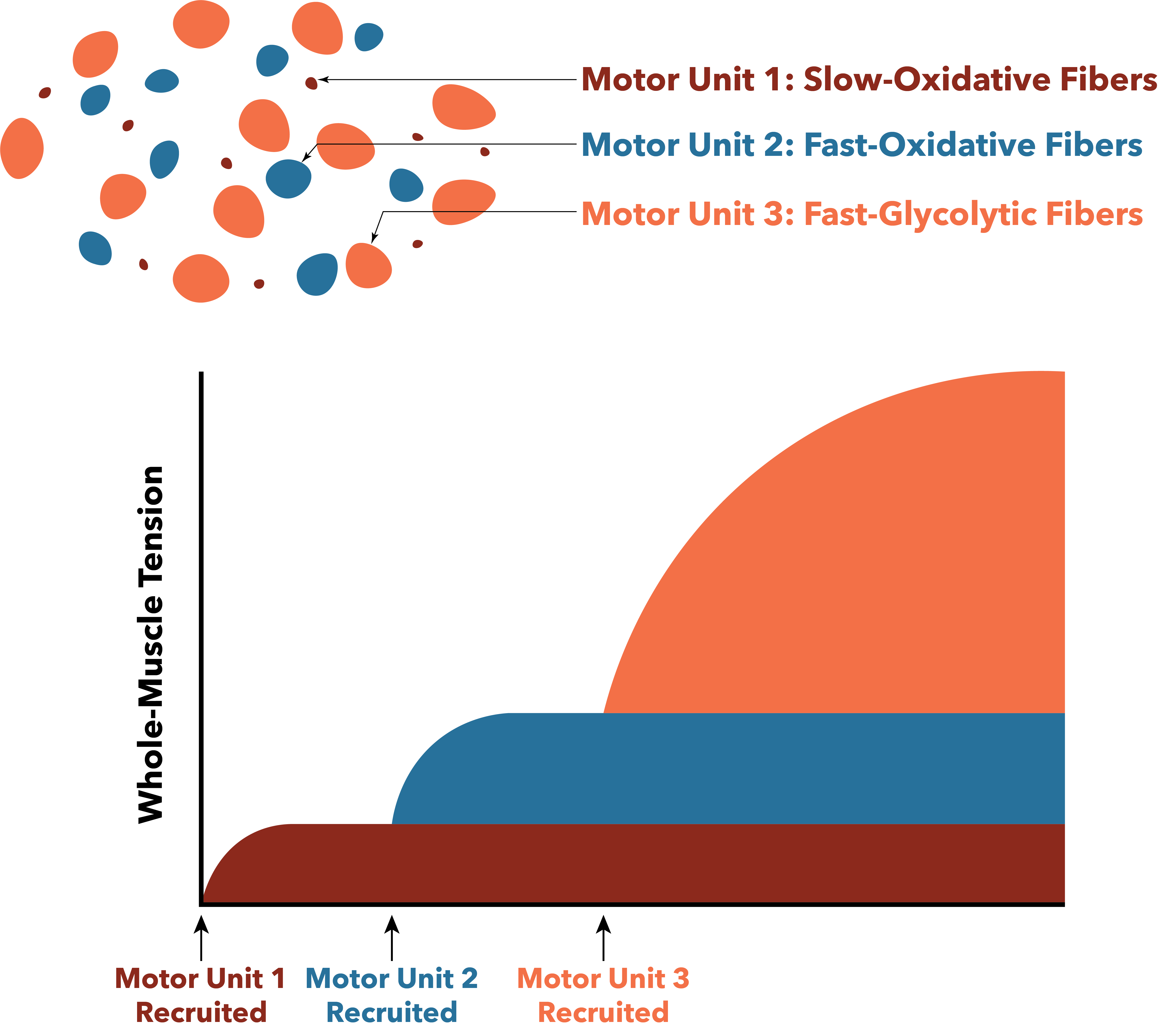
Graph depicting increasing muscle tension by recruitment of subsequent muscle fiber types (i.e. Slow-Oxidative Fibers, Fast-Oxidative Fibers, and Fast-Glycolytic Fibers)

Burke himself recognized the risk in classifying motor units:

My friend the late Elwood Henneman told me several times in conversation that he thought classifying motor units into distinct categories was probably a bad idea because, unless used with care, classifications tend to distort reality. I agreed, and still do, that taxonomies can lead to overly rigid thinking (and sometimes even lack of thinking) but they are necessary for communication, which requires that things be named; and scientific communication demands that things be named precisely, according to their attributes.

If a correlation were to be drawn between Henneman's size principle and the motor unit categorization of Burke regarding the order of motor unit recruitment, it would resemble the following order: the smallest units, S (slow) (Slow-Oxidative), would be recruited first, followed by larger FR (fast, resistant) (Fast-Oxidative) units, and lastly the largest FF (fast, fatigable) (Fast-Glycolytic) units, reserved for high-energy tasks that require additional motor unit recruitment.

== Rate coding of muscle force ==
The force produced by a single motor unit is determined in part by the number of muscle fibers in the unit. Another important determinant of force is the frequency with which the muscle fibers are stimulated by their innervating axon. The rate at which the nerve impulses arrive is known as the motor unit firing rate and may vary from frequencies low enough to produce a series of single twitch contractions to frequencies high enough to produce a fused tetanic contraction. Generally, this allows a 2 to 4-fold change in force. In general, the motor unit firing rate of each individual motor unit increases with increasing muscular effort until a maximum rate is reached. This smooths out the incremental force changes which would otherwise occur as each additional unit was recruited.

== Proportional control of muscle force ==
The distribution of motor unit size is such that there is an inverse relationship between the number of motor units and the force each generates (i.e., the number of muscle fibers per motor unit). Thus, there are many small motor units and progressively fewer larger motor units. This means that at low levels of recruitment, the force increment due to recruitment is small, whereas in forceful contractions, the force increment becomes much larger. Thus the ratio between the force increment produced by adding another motor unit and the force threshold at which that unit is recruited remains relatively constant.

== Electrodiagnostic testing ==
In medical electrodiagnostic testing for a patient with weakness, careful analysis of the "motor unit action potential" (MUAP) size, shape, and recruitment pattern can help in distinguishing a myopathy from a neuropathy.

== See also ==
- Motor unit number estimation
- Myopathy
- Neuropathy
