= Neuromuscular ultrasound =

Neuromuscular ultrasound refers to a field in medicine in which ultrasound is used to diagnose and guide treatment for people with neuromuscular diseases. Neuromuscular ultrasound is often combined with electrodiagnosis, and particularly nerve conduction studies and EMG, to improve the accuracy of diagnosis and add anatomic information to the functional information obtained with electrodiagnosis. It has been demonstrated that neuromuscular ultrasound adds value to the diagnosis of nerve disease in over 80% of cases.

Neuromuscular ultrasound is similar, and has some overlap with musculoskeletal ultrasound, although the latter pertains more to imaging of joints, whereas neuromuscular ultrasound typically involves imaging of nerves and muscles. Ultrasound imaging continues to improve rapidly, and because it is relatively inexpensive, does not involve radiation, and is portable, it is the imaging option of choice in a variety of diseases. Neuromuscular ultrasound in particular is used in the diagnosis of carpal tunnel syndrome, ulnar nerve entrapment, other neuropathies, Charcot-Marie-Tooth Disease, muscular dystrophies, ALS, and other conditions affecting nerves and muscles.

The International Society of Peripheral Neurophysiological Imaging was founded in 2012 to address the growing need for education and research in the field of neuromuscular ultrasound. The 1st International Conference and Course was held in Rome May 24–26, 2012. The 2nd International Conference and Course on Neuromuscular Ultrasound will be held May 16–18, 2013 in Charleston, South Carolina. www.ispni.org
