= List of adverse effects of venlafaxine =

The following list shows the rates of adverse symptoms seen in people taking venlafaxine.

== Very common (>10% incidence) ==
- Headache — an often transient side effect that is common to most serotonin reuptake inhibitors and that most often occurs at the beginning of therapy or after a dose escalation.
- Nausea — an adverse effect that is more common with venlafaxine than with the SSRIs. Usually transient and less severe in those receiving the extended release formulations.
- Insomnia
- Asthenia (weakness)
- Dizziness
- Ejaculation disorder — sexual side effects can be seen with virtually any antidepressant, especially those that inhibit the reuptake of serotonin (including venlafaxine).
- Somnolence
- Dry mouth
- Sweating
- Withdrawal

== Common (1–10% incidence) ==
- Constipation
- Nervousness
- Abnormal vision
- Anorgasmia
- Hypertension
- Impotence
- Paresthesia
- Tremor
- Vasodilation
- Vomiting
- Weight loss
- Chills
- Palpitations
- Confusion
- Depersonalization
- Night sweats
- Menstrual disorders associated with increased bleeding or increased irregular bleeding (e.g. menorrhagia, metrorrhagia)
- Urinary frequency increased
- Abnormal dreams
- Decreased libido
- Increased muscle tonus
- Yawning
- Abnormality of accommodation
- Abnormal ejaculation/orgasm (males)
- Urinary hesitancy
- Serum cholesterol increased (especially when treatment is prolonged and it may be dose-dependent)

== Uncommon (0.1-1% incidence) ==
- Face edema (Swelling)
- Intentional injury (Self-injury)
- Malaise
- Moniliasis (Candidiasis/Thrush)
- Neck stiffness
- Pelvic pain
- Photosensitivity reaction
- Suicide attempt
- Withdrawal syndrome
- Hypotension (Low blood pressure)
- Postural hypotension
- Syncope (Fainting)
- Tachycardia (High heart rate)
- Bruxism (Teeth grinding)
- Ecchymosis (Bruising)
- Mucous membrane bleeding
- Gastrointestinal bleeding
- Abnormal liver function tests
- Hyponatraemia (Low blood sodium)
- Weight gain
- Apathy
- Hallucinations
- Myoclonus (Twitching or Muscle spasm)
- Rash
- Abnormal orgasm (females)
- Urinary retention (Inability to pass urine)
- Angioedema (Swelling of skin or mucous membranes)
- Agitation
- Impaired coordination & balance
- Alopecia (Hair loss)
- Tinnitus (Ringing in the ears, Hearing sounds)
- Proteinuria (Protein in urine)

== Rare (0.01–0.1% incidence) ==
- Syndrome of inappropriate antidiuretic hormone secretion (SIADH)
- Thrombocytopenia
- Prolonged bleeding time
- Seizures
- Mania
- Neuroleptic malignant syndrome (NMS)
- Serotonin syndrome
- Akathisia/psychomotor restlessness
- Urinary incontinence

== Very rare (<0.01% incidence) ==
- Anaphylaxis
- QT prolongation
- Ventricular fibrillation
- Ventricular tachycardia (including torsades de pointes)
- Pancreatitis
- Blood dyscrasias (including agranulocytosis, aplastic anaemia, neutropenia and pancytopenia)
- Elevated serum prolactin
- Delirium
- Extrapyramidal reactions (including dystonia and dyskinesia)
- Tardive dyskinesia
- Pulmonary eosinophilia
- Erythema multiforme
- Stevens–Johnson syndrome
- Pruritus
- Urticaria
- Toxic epidermal necrolysis
- Angle closure glaucoma
