= Michael Jeffrey Aminoff =

American clinical neurologist and neurophysiologist

Michael Jeffrey Aminoff FRCP
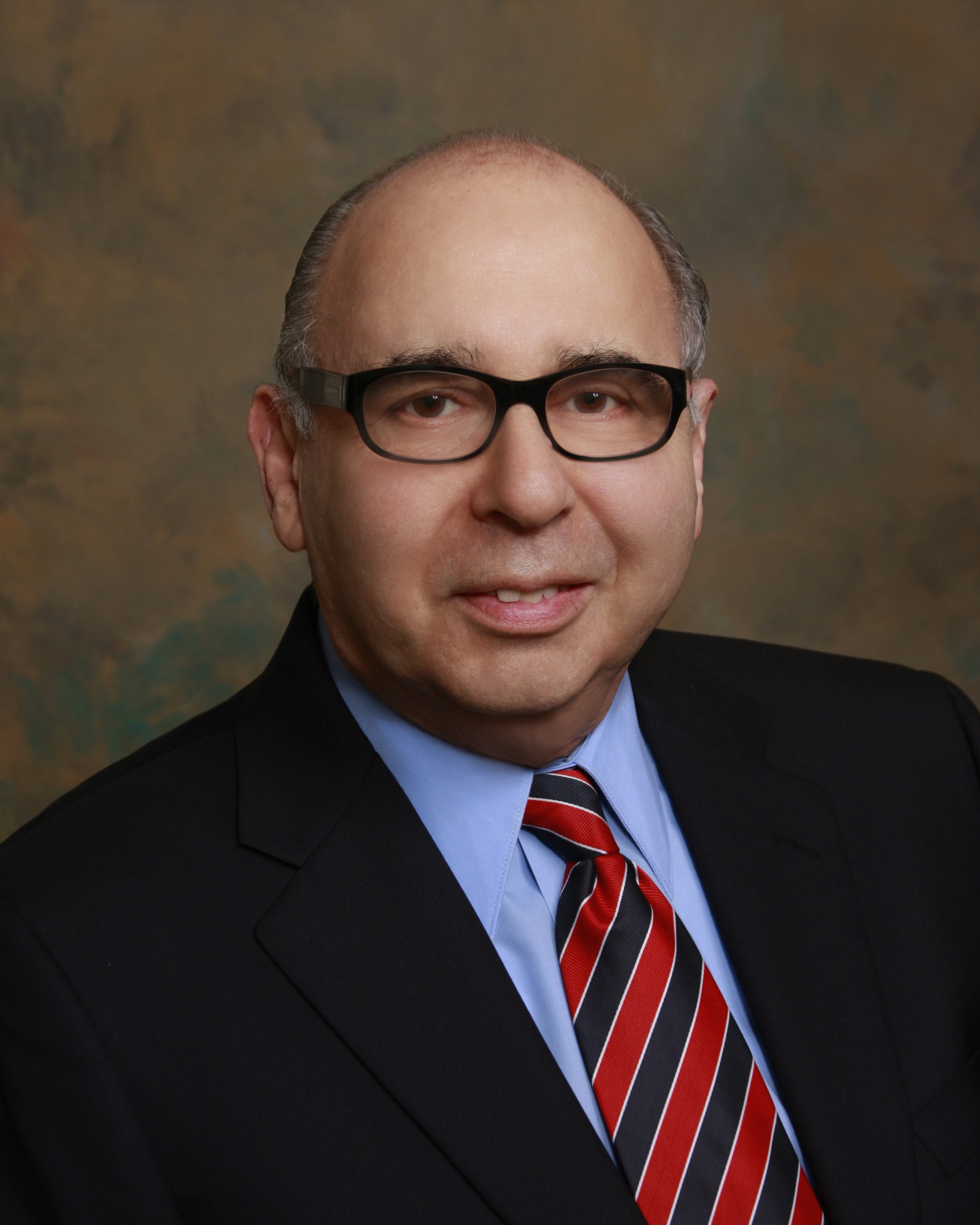
- Aminoff in 2013 by RCL Portrait Design
- Born: 1941 (age 84–85); Little Paxton, England
- Citizenship: US
- Education: University College London and University College Hospital Medical School, London, UK
- Occupation: Neurologist
- Years active: 53 years
- Medical career
- Profession: Professor of Neurology, School of Medicine, University of California, San Francisco
- Field: Neurology and Neurophysiology
- Institutions: University of California, San Francisco
- Sub-specialties: Movement Disorders specialist; clinical neurophysiologist; medical educator
- Research: Electrophysiological studies of the nervous system

Michael Jeffrey Aminoff (born 1941 in Little Paxton, England) is a clinical neurologist and neurophysiologist whose later clinical work focused on treating Parkinson's disease and related movement disorders.

== Early life and education ==
Aminoff was born and educated in England, graduating from University College London in 1962 and as a physician from University College Hospital Medical School in 1965. He subsequently trained in neurology and neurophysiology at The National Hospital (Queen Square) in London.

== Career ==
Aminoff moved to San Francisco in 1976, where he became Professor of Neurology in 1982 at the School of Medicine of the University of California, San Francisco (UCSF). He was awarded the title of distinguished professor in 2010. He was certified in neurology by the American Board of Psychiatry & Neurology (ABPN) in 1982 (recertified, 2004) and received subspecialty certification in clinical neurophysiology by the ABPN when this new subspecialty was created in 1992.

Aminoff directed UCSF's Clinical Neurophysiology Laboratories until 2004. Aminoff also directed UCSF's Parkinson's Disease Clinic and Research Center,

He has received numerous honors and awards for his work as an educator and neurologist, including the Lifetime Achievement Award from the American Association of Neuromuscular & Electrodiagnostic Medicine in 2006, and the 2007 A.B. Baker Award of the American Academy of Neurology for lifetime achievements and contributions to medical education. From 2004 to 2012 he was a director of the American Board of Psychiatry and Neurology, serving as chair of the board in 2011 and in 2010 UCSF awarded him the title of Distinguished Professor.

He has written many medical and scientific papers, particularly on electrophysiological studies of the nervous system in health and disease. He has written or edited 40 books. He was editor-in-chief of the neuroscience journal Muscle and Nerve from 1998 to 2007.

Aminoff is the author of biographies of C.E. Brown-Séquard, Sir Charles Bell, and Victor Horsley. With Larry R. Faulkner he edited a volume on the history of the American Board of Psychiatry and Neurology.

== Research ==
Aminoff's original contributions span several overlapping areas, using electrophysiological techniques to investigate nervous system function in health and disease. His work has focused on extending the clinical applications of electrodiagnostic techniques and providing insight into the underlying pathophysiology of various disorders. His work on different aspects of the autonomic nervous system showed involvement of sympathetic fibers in entrapment neuropathies; the importance of spinal mechanisms in the control of breathing; the nature and consequences of the dysautonomia occurring in patients with Parkinson's disease; and the nature of the involuntary motor activity that follows cessation of the cerebral circulation (syncope). His studies of the physiology of sensory discrimination and motor control showed that the discrimination-response system is organized as a parallel network rather than in the serial manner often portrayed, and he provided evidence that the long-latency stretch responses have a transcerebral pathway in humans, are under some degree of voluntary control, and relate to the organization of the discrimination-response system. His studies provided electrophysiological evidence for different types of dementia and defined their electrophysiological characteristics.

Aminoff's clinical studies of spinal vascular malformations (dural arteriovenous fistulas) led to a new theory on their pathophysiology. He and his collaborators suggested that increased venous pressure reduces the intramedullary arteriovenous pressure gradient and thus blood flow, leading to spinal cord ischemia. This is now widely accepted and has had major implications for the treatment of these lesions. His later interest in movement disorders led him to show the utility of botulinum toxin in the treatment of various movement disorders, and then to study gene therapy in managing patients with Parkinson's disease.

== Books ==
- Aminoff MJ: Spinal Angiomas. Blackwell: Oxford, 1976
- Aminioff MJ: Electromyography in Clinical Practice. Addison Wesley: Reading, Mass., 1978
- Aminoff MJ (Ed): Electrodiagnosis in Clinical Neurology. Churchill Livingstone: New York.
  First Edition, 1980; Second Edition, 1986; Third Edition, 1992; Fourth Edition, 1999; Fifth Edition, 2005; Sixth Edition, 2012 (as Aminoff’s Electrodiagnosis in Clinical Neurology)
- Consultant in neurology and neurophysiology and Asst. Editor for the Encyclopedia and Dictionary of Laboratory Medicine and Technology, Bennington JL (Ed), Saunders: Philadelphia, 1984
- Aminoff MJ (Ed): Electrodiagnosis issue, Neurologic Clinics. Saunders: Philadelphia, 1985
  Portuguese (Brazilian) translation published as a separate book, 1987
- Aminoff MJ: Electromyography in Clinical Practice. Electrodiagnostic Aspects of Neuromuscular Disease. 2nd Edition (expanded). Churchill Livingstone: NY, 1987
  3rd Edition, Churchill Livingstone: NY, 1998
- Simon RP, Aminoff MJ, Greenberg DA: Clinical Neurology. Appleton & Lange: Norwalk, 1989.
  Second Edition, 1993; Third edition, 1996; Fourth Edition, 1999; Fifth Edition, 2002; Sixth Edition, 2005; Seventh Edition, 2009; Eighth Edition, 2012; Ninth Edition, 2015; Tenth Edition, 2018, 11th Edition 2021
- Aminoff MJ (Ed): Neurology and General Medicine. Churchill Livingstone: New York. First Edition, 1989
  Second Edition, 1995; Third Edition, 2001; Fourth Edition, 2008; Fifth Edition, 2014 (with Josephson SA; as Aminoff’s Neurology and General Medicine); Sixth edition, 2021
- Aminoff MJ: Brown-Séquard: A Visionary of Science. Raven Press, New York, 1993
- Goetz CG, Tanner CM, Aminoff MJ (Eds): Handbook of Clinical Neurology, Volume 63: Systemic Disease, Part 1. Elsevier, Amsterdam, 1993
- Tollerud D, Aminoff MJ, et al.: "Veterans and Agent Orange," Update 1996. NAP, Washington, 1996;
  Update 1998. NAP, Washington, 1998; Herbicide/Dioxin exposure and type 2 diabetes. NAP, Washington, 2000
- Goetz CG, Aminoff MJ (Eds): Handbook of Clinical Neurology, Volume 70: Systemic Diseases, Part II, Elsevier, Amsterdam, 1998
- Aminoff MJ, Goetz CG (Eds): Handbook of Clinical Neurology, Volume 71: Systemic Diseases, Part III, Elsevier, Amsterdam, 1998
- Brown WF, Bolton CF, Aminoff MJ (Eds): Neuromuscular Function and Disease: Basic, Clinical and Electrodiagnostic Aspects. 2 Volumes. Saunders, Philadelphia, 2002
- Aminoff MJ, Daroff RB (Eds): Encyclopedia of the Neurological Sciences. 4 Volumes. Academic Press, San Diego, 2003; Second edition, 2014
- Aminoff MJ: Brown-Séquard: An Improbable Genius Who Transformed Medicine. Oxford University Press, New York, 2011
- Aminoff MJ, Faulkner L (Eds): The American Board of Psychiatry and Neurology: Looking Back and Moving Ahead. American Psychiatric Publishing, Washington, DC, 2012
- Jones HR, Burns TM, Aminoff MJ, Pomeroy SL (Eds): The Netter Collection of Medical Illustrations, 2nd Edition. Volume 7: The Nervous System. (In two volumes or parts). Elsevier Saunders, Philadelphia, 2013; 3rd Edition edited by Aminoff MJ, Pomeroy SL, Levin KH, 2024
- Aminoff MJ: Sir Charles Bell: His Life, Art, Neurological Concepts, and Controversial Legacy. Oxford University Press, New York, 2017
- Aminoff MJ: Victor Horsley: The World’s First Neurosurgeon and His Conscience, Cambridge University Press, Cambridge, 2022
- Ralph JW, Walker FO, Aminoff MJ: Aminoff’s Diagnosis of Neuromuscular Disorders, 4th Edition. Elsevier Academic Press, San Diego, 2024

== Television appearances ==
Parkinson's Disease: A Dose of Hope. Program on Parkinson's disease for patients and caregivers produced by UCTV and aired nationally for 1 week in 2011.

Parkinson's: Latest from the Experts. Program on Parkinson's disease for health-care professionals produced by UCTV and aired nationally for 1 week in 2011.
