= Rocky Mountain University of Health Professions =

For-profit university in Provo, Utah, US

Coordinates: 40°12′42″N 111°39′21″W

- Type: Private; For-profit
- Established: 1998
- President: Dr. Cameron K. Martin
- Academic staff: 159
- Administrative staff: 141
- Students: 1684 (2024)
- Location: Provo, Utah, United States
- Campus: Urban
- Website: rm.edu

Rocky Mountain University of Health Professions (RMU) is a private, for-profit university focused on graduate healthcare education and located in Provo, Utah. It was established in 1998 and is accredited by the Northwest Commission of Colleges and Universities.

== History ==
Rocky Mountain University of Health Professions was established in 1998 by Dr. Richard P. Nielsen and Dr. Michael Skurja Jr. as a post-professional graduate healthcare institution. Nielsen and Skurja, both board-certified electrophysiologists, had co-founded the Institute for Clinical Electrophysiology in 1993, and had been involved in developing continuing education courses for several years. They dreamed of combining all of the curricula they had developed into a Doctor of Electrophysiology program, but the Institute wasn't authorized to award degrees, only certificates. Nielsen and Skurja began the process of obtaining authorization from the Utah State Board of Regents, and on June 8, 1998, The Institute for Clinical Electrophysiology officially became Rocky Mountain University of Physical Therapy and began offering a Doctor of Physical Therapy (DPT) program with seven specialty concentrations, including cardiopulmonology, electrophysiology, geriatrics, neurology, orthopedics, sports, and pediatrics.

The following year, in 1999, instruction officially began with ten faculty, six employees, and eight students in the first class. Ninety students enrolled in the first year. In December 2000, Rocky Mountain University of Physical Therapy was registered as a developing institution with the Northwest Commission of Colleges and Universities for regional accreditation. That same year, RMUoHP began offering its Master of Science in Physical Therapy program and the university's name was changed to Rocky Mountain University of Health Professions (RMUoHP).

By 2003 RMUoHP had added the first post-professional Doctor of Occupational Therapy (OTD) program in the country. The university gained regional accreditation candidacy status in November 2005 and added a Doctor of Nursing Practice (DNP) program the following year. RMUoHP also expanded its OTD program to include specialty tracks, and began offering a Doctor of Science in Health Sciences program in 2007.

In May 2010 RMU began offering a residency entry-level Doctor of Physical Therapy program, and became the first proprietary graduate institution in the NW region to gain accreditation by the Northwest Commission of Colleges and Universities.

In 2014 RMUoHP began offering the first limited-residency model Doctor of Clinical Science in Speech-Language Pathology program. By the next year RMUoHP had also added its entry-level Master of Physician Assistant Studies, and in 2016 its entry-level Post-Bachelor's Doctor of Nursing Practice (FNP) program, as well as a Master of Science in Speech-Language Pathology program with a medical emphasis in 2017. RMU is one of the pioneer institutions for Speech-Language Pathology with a medical emphasis.

In October 2022, RMU announced it was launching the first College of Optometry in the Intermountain West. The first cohort of students began the program in May 2023.

In January 2023, Dr. Cameron K. Martin took the helm as President of the graduate healthcare institution.

RMU now awards 22 master's and doctoral degrees and 24 certificates and fellowships.

== Campus ==
Rocky Mountain University of Health Professions is located in Provo, Utah, in the Novell Tower. The RMU Health Clinics and additional educational spaces are located in Building 3 of the Timpanogas Technology Campus.

=== Housing ===
All student housing is off-campus and generally includes apartments and houses for residential students and hotels for non-residential students. RMUoHP does not own, operate, or maintain housing facilities for students.

== Academics ==
RMU awards 22 graduate and doctoral degrees and 24 certificates and fellowships, including:

=== Master’s programs ===
- Master of Medical Science (MMSc) for physician assistants
- Master of Science in Medical Speech-Language Pathology (MS MedSLP)
- Master of Science in Counseling (MSCO)
- Master of Science in Nursing (MSN)
- Master of Occupational Therapy (OTA-MOT Bridge) (MOT)

=== Doctoral programs ===
- Doctor of Medical Sciences (DMSc) for physician assistants
- Doctor of Philosophy in Health Science (PhD)
- Post-Master's Doctor of Nursing Practice (DNP)
- Post-Bachelor's Doctor of Nursing Practice Family Nurse Practitioner (DNP/FNP)
- Doctor of Physical Therapy (DPT)
- Doctor of Optometry (OD)
- Doctor of Occupational Therapy - entry-level (OTD)
- Post-Professional Doctor of Occupational Therapy (pOTD)
- Doctor of Speech-Language Pathology (SLPD)
- Transitional Doctor of Physical Therapy in Pediatric Science (tDPT)

=== Certificate programs ===
- Post-Master's Family Nurse Practitioner Certificate (FNP Cert)
- Post-Master's Emergency Nurse Practitioner Certificate (ENP Cert)
- Post-Master's Psychiatric Mental Health Nurse Practitioner Certificate Program (PMHNP)
- Dual Family Nurse Practitioner/Emergency Nurse Practitioner Certificate (FNP/ENP Cert)
- Dual Family Nurse Practitioner/Psychiatric Mental Health Nurse Practitioner Certificate (FNP/PMHNP Cert)
- Post-Master's Counseling Certificates
- Post-Master's Occupational Therapy Certificates
- Psychiatry Certificate (for Physician Assistants)
- Healthcare Leadership & Administration Certificate (HLA Cert)
- Healthcare Professions Education Certificate (HPE Cert)
- Seattle Children's Neonatology Fellowship
- Academic Residency (for physical therapists)

RMU's 2024 total enrollment was 1,684.

== Research ==
The RMU Foundation provides funding and support for student and faculty research in the field of health science. In 2018, RMU launched and funded $19,960 worth of internal grants to faculty engaged in a wide range of research.

Current faculty and student research efforts include projects related to clinical development, education, and clinical interventions. RMU faculty are engaged in research designed to enhance cultural competency and examining the prevalence of evidence-based practice among recent alumni from RMU. Other faculty are seeking to enhance clinical placement by examining the motivations of clinical educations. The university is engaged in interprofessional education whereby students from different disciplines collaborate to treat cases, and faculty are evaluating the effectiveness of this novel intervention.

=== Office of Research and Sponsored Projects ===
In August 2017, RMU established the Office of Research and Sponsored Projects (ORSP). ORSP's purpose is to remove barriers for faculty and students to conduct innovative research that will enhance knowledge and provide evidence for better clinical practice.
