= American Association of Neuromuscular & Electrodiagnostic Medicine =

The American Association of Neuromuscular & Electrodiagnostic Medicine (AANEM) is a medical society for the medical subspecialty of neuromuscular and electrodiagnostic medicine based in the United States. Members are primarily neurologists and physiatrists—as well as allied health professionals and PhD researchers.

== History ==
In 1951, a small group of physicians who practiced clinical electromyography and electrodiagnosis began working to organize a professional society dedicated to the growing medical specialty of electrodiagnostic medicine. Their goal was to create a professional network; to build a platform for discussion of research; and to establish standards and measure quality. On August 29, 1953, another gathering took place at the Palmer House in Chicago, IL, to formally organize the American Association of Electromyography and Electrodiagnosis (AAEE).

== Membership ==
AANEM has several membership categories depending upon an individual's credentials. Physicians who are board certified in Electrodiagnostic Medicine (as determined by the American Board of Electrodiagnostic Medicine) are “Fellow” members. There are also categories for physicians-in-training, international physicians, and academic researchers, nerve conduction study technologists, and collaborators.

AANEM Technologist members assist with studies such as nerve conduction studies (NCSs), electroencephalograms (EEGs), intraoperative monitoring (IOM), evoked potentials, polysomnography, and ultrasound.

AANEM collaborator members are nonphysician providers who work in collaboration with a neurologist or PMR physician to treat patients with neuromuscular diseases. Collaborators do not perform or interpret needle electromyography (EMG) studies or interpret NCSs but are active in the field of neuromuscular medicine.

AANEM research members are currently active in neuromuscular or electrodiagnostic research and are a PhD investigator, engineer, holder of a master's degree, or graduate student enrolled in a PhD degree program. Affiliations

AANEM participates in the International Federation of Clinical Neurophysiology (IFCN). The IFCN consists of national member societies.

== Education ==
Since 1954, the AANEM has held an annual meeting. The meeting offers educational sessions updating physicians, technologists, and researchers working in the area of neuromuscular, musculoskeletal, and electrodiagnostic medicine. Attendees earn continuing medical education (CME) through hands-on workshops and educational sessions. In addition to the annual meeting, the association holds small-group workshops around the country covering ultrasound and nerve conduction studies.

To help members obtain continuing medical education (CME), AANEM is accredited by the Accreditation Council for Continuing Medical Education (ACCME) to provide CME credit as Accreditation with Commendation.) The AANEM offers many CME products including: course books, interactive cases, case studies, journal articles, and self-study materials.

AANEM offers podcasts by a diverse group of practicing physicians who describe their research and practical insights.

== Advocacy ==
AANEM tracks and responds to federal and state legislative and regulatory health policies related to neuromuscular and electrodiagnostic medicine. Activities include creating guidelines and position statements to educate lawmakers and insurance companies, partnering with governmental agencies and private insurers to fight fraud and abuse and advocating for quality patient care. AANEM's guidelines are published through the US Department of Health & Human Services Agency for Healthcare Research and Quality National Guidelines Clearinghouse. AANEM also participated in the Choosing Wisely campaign established by the American Board of Internal Medicine (ABIM) Foundation by creating a list of five situations in which electrodiagnostic and other imaging studies are inappropriate in an effort to educate patients and spur conversation between the provider and the patient.

AANEM monitors private sector market trends and critical practice issues and provides members with updates, practice management resources, and tools to respond to the constantly evolving healthcare environment. The association also works closely with several other medical societies and patient advocacy groups to ensure that neuromuscular patients have adequate access to necessary, quality treatment.

AANEM has a seat in of the AMA House of Delegates and participates in both the Relative Value Scale Update Committee (RUC) and Current Procedural Terminology (CPT) processes. These groups give physicians a voice in establishing new and revised electrodiagnostic and neuromuscular codes as well as being a part of the process used to assign relative value units to new and established CPT codes.

== American Board of Electrodiagnostic Medicine ==
In 1963, the AANEM began discussion of an examination as an educational experience for membership candidates. The first examination was given in 1967 and successful candidates were transferred to the association active membership category. In 1987 the AANEM approved to separate its membership and examination functions. The American Board of Electrodiagnostic Medicine (ABEM) was created as an autonomous examining body that offered formal certification of competency in electrodiagnostic medicine. The ABEM examination is the only United States exam certifying physicians in EDX medicine, with more than 3,500 physicians currently certified. The ABEM certification process requires physicians to obtain specific academic training and clinical experience, then demonstrate competency in the EDX evaluation of neuromuscular and musculoskeletal systems by passing an examination. Diplomates of the ABEM are required to document their continuing education in electrodiagnostic medicine over the course of the ABEM Maintenance of Certification Program (MOCP) and take a maintenance examination.

The American Board of Psychiatry and Neurology provides certification examination in the related field of clinical neurophysiology. The American Board of Clinical Neurophysiology certifies in electroencephalography (EEG), Evoked Potentials (EP), Polysomnography (PSG), Epilepsy Monitoring, and Neurologic Intraoperative Monitoring (NIOM). In the US physicians typically specialize in EEG or EDX medicine but not both.

== Laboratory Accreditation ==
The AANEM developed the Electrodiagnostic Laboratory Accreditation Program in 2010 as a voluntary, peer-review process that identifies and acknowledges electrodiagnostic laboratories that achieve and maintain the highest level of quality, performance, and integrity based on professional standards.

== AANEM Foundation ==
In 1995 the AANEM established the AANEM Foundation for Research & Education, as a charitable, 501(c)3 nonprofit organization to advance research and science related to muscle and nerve disorders. The AANEM Foundation helps fund numerous studies and research awards related to neuromuscular and electrodiagnostic medicine.

== Publications ==
In 1982, Muscle & Nerve, a monthly, peer-reviewed, scientific journal, became the AANEM's official journal. Published by Wiley, the journal publishes research and education directly related to neuromuscular and electrodiagnostic topics.

The AANEM News is the official publication of AANEM. The print newsletter is distributed to all members biannually and includes updates on legislation, education, and products or programs related to neuromuscular and electrodiagnostic medicine and the association.

The AANEM e-newsletter was launched in 2008. It provides information to AANEM members about coding and advocacy issues, new products, and other relevant information.

== See also ==
- Electrodiagnostic medicine
- Neuromuscular medicine
- Neuromuscular disease
