= Stanley Salmons =

British academic (born 1939)

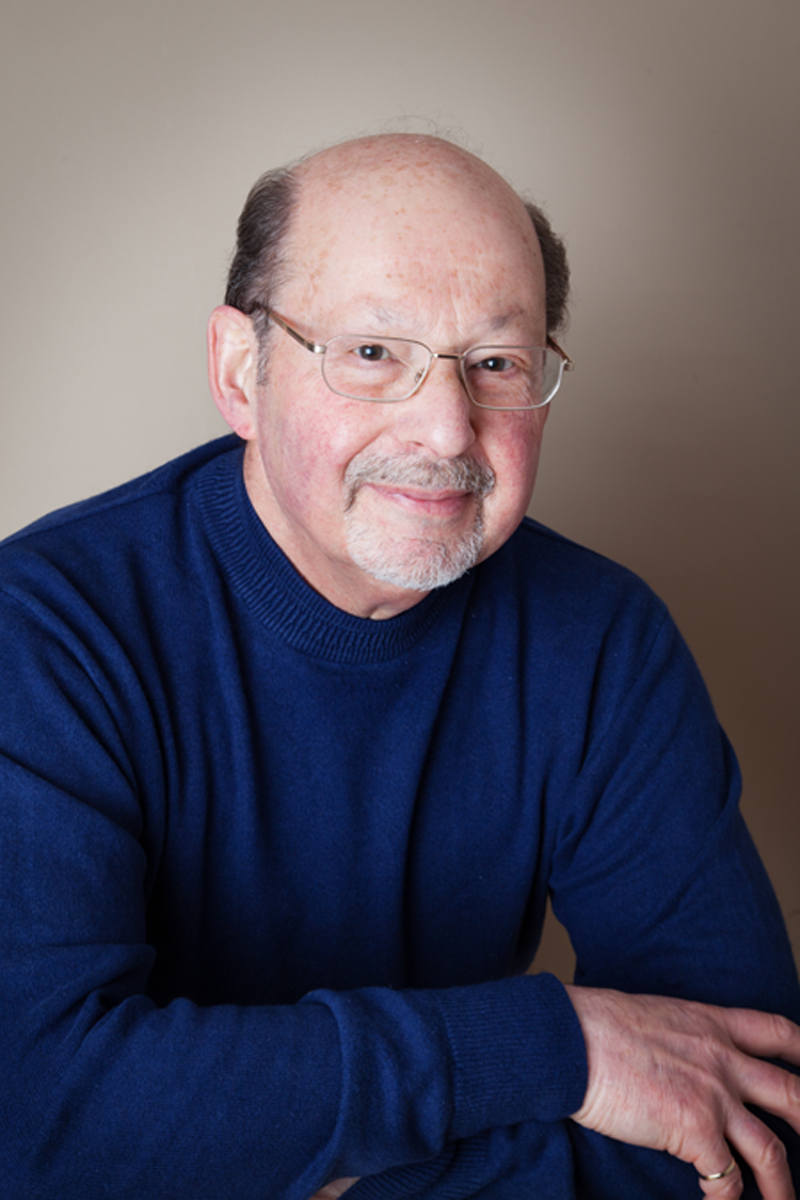
- Professor Stanley Salmons in 2012
- Born: Stanley Salmons; April 14, 1939 (age 87); Lower Clapton, east London
- Spouse: Paula Salmons (dd. 19 Feb 2025)

Stanley Salmons (born 1939) is a British academic and scientist. A Professor Emeritus of Medical Cell Biology at Liverpool University, he is known for his pioneering research in the neurology, biochemistry and physiology of skeletal muscle. In 1967 he designed the first implantable neuromuscular stimulator and in 1969 he "was the first to introduce the design of the buckle-type transducer for recording directly in vivo tendon forces in animals." His 1976 work with the implanted electrical "pacemakers" on rabbit muscles (published in Nature) clarified the relationship between nerve signals and muscle chemistry and established the adaptive nature of skeletal muscle. The associated changes in myosin isoforms overturned the accepted notion that a terminally differentiated tissue was incapable of re-expressing its genome.

== Life and career ==
Salmons was born in Lower Clapton, east London, and was educated at St. Marylebone Grammar School. He was awarded a Royal Scholarship to attend the Imperial College in London, from which he graduated in physics and went on to gain a D.I.C. in Electronics and Communications. Salmons later attended the University College London on a Nuffield Foundation bursary, where he graduated with a master's degree in physiology. He was then appointed to a research fellowship in the Department of Anatomy, University of Birmingham, where he subsequently held a Stothert Research Fellowship of the Royal Society. He also worked for a time in the Department of Physiology at Harvard Medical School.

He was a senior lecturer when he left Birmingham University for the University of Liverpool, where he was professor of medical cell biology from 1987 until 1996 and is now a professor emeritus. Salmons gave the 1989 Erasmus Wilson Demonstration at the Royal College of Surgeons of England, and has also served as Director of the British Heart Foundation Skeletal Muscle Assist Research Group. He is a fellow of the Institute of Physics and Engineering in Medicine and of the Anatomical Society and was a former president of the International Society on Biotelemetry. He helped found the International Functional Electrical Stimulation Society and is an honorary member of the board of directors for Deutsche Gesellschaft für Elektrostimulation und Elektrotherapie.

Salmons has written over 200 scientific articles and 12 scientific books, as well as more than 40 short stories, 19 novels, and 2 children's books.

== Bibliography (selective) ==
=== Fiction ===
- A Bit of Irish Mist, 2005.
- Footprints in the Ash, 2008, 2nd ed 2015.
- NH3, 2013.
- The Man in Two Bodies, 2014.
- The Domino Man, 2015.
- The Canterpurry Tales, 2014, 2nd ed 2017.
- The Tomb and other stories, Kindle 2015
- Counterfeit, 2016
- The Reich Legacy, 2017
- Saturn Run, 2017
- Mars Run, 2018
- Jupiter Run, 2018
- Vendetta, 2018
- Cell Line, 2019
- Red Nebula, 2019
- Rogue Gene, 2020
- "Blue on Blue", 2020
- "The Girl in the Silver Spacesuit", 2021
- "War & Purrs", 2022
- "The Gold of Nubia", 2022
- "Escape from Death Row", 2022
- "This Hostile Planet", 2024
- "Sixty Seconds", 2024
- "The Magician's Tomb", 2026

=== Most cited peer-reviewed articles ===
- S Salmons "An implantable muscle stimulator" 1967 Journal of Physiology 1967, Volume 188, pp 13–14P.
- S Salmons, J Henriksson "The adaptive response of skeletal muscle to increased use" Muscle and Nerve 1981, Volume 4, Issue 2, pp 94–105 (cited 661 times in Google Scholar as of September 2014)
- S Salmons, FA Sreter "Significance of impulse activity in the transformation of skeletal muscle type" Nature 1976, Volume 263, Issue 5572, pp 30–34 (cited 586 times in Google Scholar as of September 2014)
- Brenda R. Eisenberg, Stanley Salmons "The reorganization of subcellular structure in muscle undergoing fast-to-slow type transformation" Cell and Tissue Research October 1981, Volume 220, Issue 3, pp 449–471 (cited 195 times in Google Scholar as of January 2013)
- Brown, WE; Salmons, S; Whalen, RG (1983). "The sequential replacement of myosin subunit isoforms during muscle type transformation induced by long term electrical stimulation". Journal of Biological Chemistry. 258 (23): 14686–14692.
- J. Henriksson, M. M. Chi, C. S. Hintz, D. A. Young, K. K. Kaiser, S. Salmons, and O. H. Lowry 1986 "Chronic stimulation of mammalian muscle: changes in enzymes of six metabolic pathways" American Journal of Physiology: Cell Physiology. vol. 251 no. 4 C614-C632 (cited 186 times in Google Scholar as of January 2013)
- Acker, MA; Hammond, RL; Mannion, JD; Salmons, S; Stephenson, LW (1987). "Skeletal muscle as the potential power source for a cardiovascular pump: assessment in vivo". Science. 236 (4799): 324–327. PMID 2951849.
- Williams, R.S.; Salmons, S.; Newsholme, E.A.; Kaufman, R.E.; Mellor, J. (1986). "Regulation of nuclear and mitochondrial expression by contractile activity in skeletal muscle". Journal of Biological Chemistry. 261: 376–80.
- Salmons, S. (2008). "Cardiac assistance from skeletal muscle: a reappraisal". European Journal of Cardiothoracic Surgery. 35: 204–13.
- Salmons, S. (2009). "Adaptive change in electrically stimulated muscle: a framework for the design of clinical protocols (Invited review)". Muscle and Nerve. 40 (6): 918–935.
- Salmons, S. (2018). "The adaptive response of skeletal muscle: what is the evidence?". Muscle & Nerve. 57: 531–41.
- Kern, H; Salmons, S; Mayr, W; Rossini, K; Carraro, U (2005). "Recovery of long-term denervated human muscles induced by electrical stimulation". Muscle & Nerve. 31: 98–101.
- Salmons, S. (2025). "Paradigm shifts: how electrical stimulation opened up new avenues in science and medicine". European Journal of Translational Myology. 35 (3).
