= Clinical electrophysiology =

Application of electrophysiology principles to medicine

Clinical electrophysiology is the application of electrophysiology principles to medicine. The two main branches of this discipline are electrotherapy and electrophysiologic testing (EEG, electromyography, etc.) Clinical electrophysiology can be utilized in the study and treatment of various physiological conditions, and most notably in clinical cardiac electrophysiology.

== Clinical cardiac electrophysiology ==
Cardiac Electrophysiology (also referred to as clinical cardiac electrophysiology, arrhythmia services, or electrophysiology), is a branch of the medical specialty of clinical cardiology and is concerned with the study and treatment of rhythm disorders of the heart.

== Assessment of the Eye ==
Through the use of electrophysiological techniques, dissections of the visual system can be made. The use of both electrophysiological information in conjunction with other clinical tests, imaging, and field instrumentation, a deep and comprehensive assessment of the ocular and visual pathways can be made. Alone, electrophysiology can also monitor ocular disease, determining drug-induced ocular toxicity, and evaluating individuals at risk for familial eye disease.

== Electroanalgesia ==
Clinical electrophysiology has been used to modulate pain for over a century. Equipment designs have improved significantly since the advent of electroanalgesia and application has been made much easier. The use of electrotherapy to modulate pain is characterized in one of four ways: subsensory-level stimulation, sensory-level stimulation, motor-level stimulation, and noxious-level stimulation. Commercial stimulators can typically achieve any of the four levels of stimulation, though some stimulators may be more adept at a certain levels of stimulation than others. Transcutaneous electrical nerve stimulation (TENS) is an umbrella term used to characterize all forms of electroanalgesia utilizing surface electrodes applied to the skin.

=== Subsensory-level stimulation ===
Peak amplitudes are typically below 1 mA and do not produce phase charges strong enough to excite peripheral nerve fibers and reach the sensory threshold. Stimulators that work at this level are termed microcurrent electrical nerve stimulators (MENS). In addition to the low amplitudes, pulse durations are short, thereby activating neither the muscle nor the nerve. No studies have shown clinical effectiveness of subsensory-level stimulation. While trade publications and clinical seminars have claimed the effectiveness of MENS on a variety of conditions, the intensity of the stimulation is too low for sensory nerve stimulation. While some researches claim that the microcurrent has an effect on the cellular activity, there is insufficient evidence to support the use of MENS in electroanalgesia.

=== Sensory-level stimulation ===
Defined as stimulation at or above the sensory threshold and below the motor threshold, sensory-level stimulation is frequently achieved with a frequency in the 50-100 pps range, with short pulse and phase durations of 2-50 μs, and low intensities. Short pulses must be used to avoid producing tetanic muscular contractions - muscular movement is not desirable in sensory-level TENS.

Amplitude is adjusted to achieve superficial cutaneous nerve fiber activation. The patient should perceive paresthesia beneath the electrodes and amplitude is adjusted according to patient feedback. The mechanism of action for this level of electroanalgesia is likely either the direct peripheral block of nerve transmission or the activation of central inhibition mechanisms of pain transmission by large-diameter fiber stimulation.

Sensory-level stimulation is the most researched level of electroanalgesia and is usually perceived by the patient as very comfortable. There should be an immediate decreased response to pain and treatment times last 20–30 minutes.

=== Motor-level stimulation ===
Response to motor-level stimulation is often not immediately but its effect is long-lasting. Due to the lack of immediate effect, treatment times are typically longer and are conducted for 45 minutes or longer. The mechanism of action may be attributed to the production of rhythmic motor contractions that activate the endogenous opiate mechanisms of analgesia. This level of electroanalgesia is most often used in patients with deep, throbbing, or chronic pain.

=== Noxious-level stimulation ===
By utilizing low frequency (1-5 pps) or high frequency (80-100 pps) stimuli with durations of up to 1 second and amplitudes that produce pain, noxious-level stimulation seeks to ameliorate pain through the induction of a painful stimulus either at the pain site or at a remote location. The mechanism of action is believed to be related to an endorphin-mediated mechanism accompanied by the release of endogenous opiates that increase the patient's pain threshold. This level of stimulation is not the first approach chosen for electroanalgesia due to its induction of pain.

== Other uses of Clinical Electrophysiology ==
- Muscle for Control of Movement and Posture
- Biofeedback for Genitourinary Dysfunction
- Electromyographic Biofeedback for Improvement of Voluntary Motor Control
- Peripheral Neuroanatomy of the Upper and Lower Extremities

== See also ==
- Clinical cardiac electrophysiology
- Electroanalgesia
