= Neck stiffness =

Stiffness of the neck

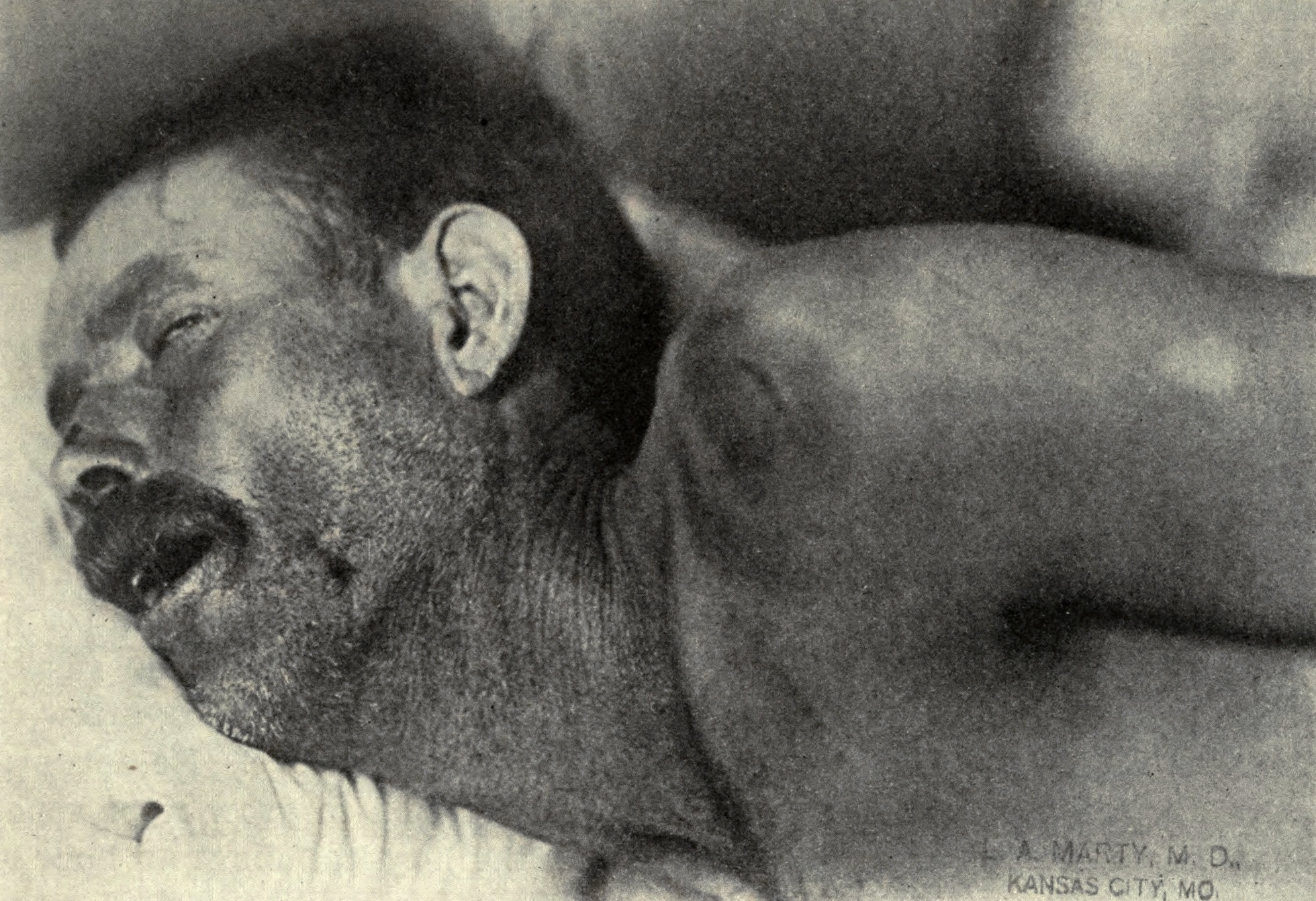
A violently ill patient with neck stiffness during the Texas meningitis epidemic of 1911 and 1912

Neck stiffness, stiff neck and nuchal rigidity are terms often used interchangeably to describe the medical condition when one experiences discomfort or pain when trying to turn, move, or flex the neck. Possible causes include muscle strain or sprain, cervical spine disorder, meningitis, and subarachnoid hemorrhage.

Nuchal rigidity due to irritation of the lining of the brain and spinal cord is one of the symptoms of meningitis.

== See also ==
- Neck pain
- Torticollis
