= Muscle & Nerve =

Peer-reviewed scientific journal

- Discipline: Neurology
- Language: English
- Edited by: Zachary Simmons

Publication details
- History: 1978–present
- Publisher: John Wiley & Sons
- Frequency: Monthly
- Impact factor: 3.217 (2020)

Standard abbreviations
- ISO 4: Muscle Nerve

Indexing
- CODEN: MUNEDE
- ISSN: 0148-639X (print); 1097-4598 (web)
- LCCN: 78643552
- OCLC no.: 972848422

Links
- Journal homepage; Online access; Online archive

Muscle & Nerve is a monthly peer-reviewed medical journal covering neuromuscular medicine. It was founded in 1978 by Walter Bradley. It is published by John Wiley & Sons on behalf of the American Association of Neuromuscular & Electrodiagnostic Medicine, of which it has been the official journal since 1982. The editor-in-chief is Zachary Simmons (Pennsylvania State University). According to the Journal Citation Reports, the journal has a 2020 impact factor of 3.217, ranking it 106th out of 208 journals in the category "Clinical Neurology" and 174th out of 273 in the category "Neurosciences".

== Editors-in-chief ==
The current editor-in-chief of Muscle & Nerve is Zachary Simmons, whose term as editor-in-chief began in January 2017. Previous editors-in-chief of the journal are:

- Lawrence Phillips, II (2008–2016)
- Michael Aminoff (1998–2007)
- Jun Kimura (1988–1997)
- Walter Bradley (1978–1987)
