= Henneman's size principle =

Principle in muscular anatomy

Henneman's size principle describes relationships between properties of motor neurons and the muscle fibers they innervate and thus control, which together are called motor units. Motor neurons with large cell bodies tend to innervate fast-twitch, high-force, less fatigue-resistant muscle fibers, whereas motor neurons with small cell bodies tend to innervate slow-twitch, low-force, fatigue-resistant muscle fibers. In order to contract a particular muscle, motor neurons with small cell bodies are recruited (i.e. begin to fire action potentials) before motor neurons with large cell bodies. It was proposed by Elwood Henneman.

== History ==
At the time of Henneman's initial study of motor neuron recruitment, it was known that neurons varied greatly in size, that is in the diameter and extent of the dendritic arbor, size of the soma, and diameter of axon. However, the functional significance of neuron size was not yet known. In 1965, Henneman and colleagues published five papers describing the firing patterns of motor neurons innervating two muscles in a cat's leg, the soleus muscle and the gastrocnemius muscle (the "calf" in a cat's hindleg).

The soleus muscle is composed of "red" muscle which was revealed to indicate that muscle fibers were fatigue-resistant but created small forces when contracting. The gastrocnemius muscle is heterogeneous, composed of both "red" and "pale" muscle, and thus containing fast-twitch high force fibers. Henneman's and colleagues took advantage of the differences between the soleus and gastrocnemius muscles to show that the neurons innervating the soleus muscle:

1. produce smaller electrical signals when measuring electrical activity of ventral roots, which they knew reflected the diameter of the motor neuron;
2. motor neurons innervating the soleus muscle fire first when the afferent nerves in the dorsal root were electrically stimulated; and
3. there is an inverse relationship between excitability of a neuron and its size.

Together, these relationship were termed the "size principle". Decades of research elaborated on these initial finding on motor neuron properties and recruitment of motor units (neuron + muscle fibers), and the relationship between neuron excitability and its size became a central focus of neurophysiology.

A neuron's size is related to its electrical excitability, and so it was hypothesized that neuron size was the causal mechanism for the recruitment order. An alternative hypothesis is that the structure of spinal circuits and inputs to motor neurons controls recruitment. Both likely contribute and reflect the astounding coordinated development of neural circuit and cellular properties in motor neurons and muscle.

A relationship between force production and recruitment order is a common feature across motor systems (vertebrates examples: human, cat, zebrafish; invertebrate examples: stick insect, drosophila, crayfish). This proposed to confer a number of computational and energetic advantages. Recruitment of additional motor units increases force nonlinearly, overcoming suppressive nonlinearities in spike rates and muscle force production. Furthermore, the relative increase in force does not decrease with successive recruitment, as it would if all motor units produced similar amounts of force. Thus, much like Weber's law describes the constant sensitivity to relative stimulus intensity, a recruitment hierarchy maximizes the resolution of motor unit force while also simplifying the dimensionality of the motor system.

== Benefits of the size principle ==
The size principle states that as more force is needed, motor units are recruited in a precise order according to the magnitude of their force output, with small units being recruited first, thus exhibiting task-appropriate recruitment. This has two very important physiological benefits. First, it minimizes the amount of fatigue an organism experiences by using fatigue-resistant muscle fibers first and only using fatigable fibers when high forces are needed. Secondly, the relative change in force produced by additional recruitment remains relatively constant. For counterexample, if all motor units produced similar force, then recruiting an additional unit might increase force by 10% when only 10 motor units are active, but produce only 1% increase when 100 are active.

== Recent studies ==
From the time of Henneman and his discovery of size principle, many studies have been done to see if his theory holds up to the results of multiple experiments. An experiment of the quadriceps femoris found that motor units are in fact recruited in an orderly manner according to the size principle. The study looked at average motor unit size and firing rate in relationships with force productions of the quadriceps femoris by using a clinical electromyograph (EMG). Results showed the size of motor units increased linearly with increased force production, and firing rate remained constant to 30% maximum force and then increased with greater generation of force. When viewing motor unit potential during muscle contraction on an EMG, as the force generated increases, the amplitude (strength) and frequency (firing rate) increases. The motor units are being recruited in an order from slow, low force to fast, high force.

== Size principle and EMGs ==
The concept of size principle can be applied to therapeutic techniques. It was shown that the use of electrical stimulation of muscles for motor control would stimulate large, fatigable motor unit first. For many years it has been believed that the use of electromyostimulation (EMS) to stimulate muscle contraction creates a reversal of the general size principle recruitment order, due to the larger motor unit axons having a lower resistance to electric current. Recently, however, the results of the studies purporting this theory have come under some minor contention. In an article titled “Recruitment Patterns in Human Skeletal Muscle During Electrical Stimulation”, Professors Chris M. Gregory and C. Scott Bickel propose instead that the muscle fiber recruitment induced by EMS is non-selective pattern that is both spatially fixed and temporally synchronous. They back this claim with physiological data, metabolic data, mechanical data, and even by re-examining the results of other studies which claimed the reverse size principle paradigm.

Despite the debate, orderly recruitment of motor units can be achieved under optical control in vivo. Thus, the use of optical control with microbial opsins has been shown to promote normal physiological order of recruitment.

== Experiments relating to size principle ==
In 1986, a study comparing factors such as conduction velocity, twitch torque, twitch rise time, and half-relaxation of stimulated tibial muscle found evidence that the conduction velocity of individual muscle fibers types may be another parameter to include in the size principle. The data from the experiments showed a high degree of correlation between the four factors, which were consistent with a similar study performed several years prior. In that study, an increase in muscle fiber conduction velocity was observed when there was a higher level of voluntary muscle contraction, which agrees with the gradual recruitment of higher-force muscle types.

In Wistar rats, it was found that cell size is the crucial property in determining neuronal recruitment. Motor neurons of different sizes have similar voltage thresholds. Smaller neurons have higher membrane resistance and require lower depolarizing current to reach spike threshold. The cell size contribution to recruitment in motor neurons during postnatal development is investigated in this experiment. Experiments were done on 1- to 7-day-old Wistar rats and 20- to 30-day-old Wistar rats as well. The 1- to 7-day-old Wistar rats were selected because early after birth, the rats show an increase in cell size. In 20- to 30-day-old Wistar rats, the physiological and anatomical features of oculomotor nucleus motor neurons remain unchanged. Rat oculomotor nucleus motor neurons were intracellularly labelled and tested using electrophysical properties. The size principle applies to the recruitment order in neonatal motor neurons and also in the adult oculomotor nucleus. The increase in size of motor neurons led to a decrease in input resistance with a strong linear relationship in both age groups.
