= Elwood Henneman =

American neurophysiologist (1915–1996)

Elwood Henneman (1915 – 22 February 1996) was an American neurophysiologist who studied the properties of vertebrate motor neurons.

== Biography and Research ==
Henneman received his bachelor's degree from Harvard College in Cambridge, Massachusetts in 1937. In 1943 he finished his medical studies at McGill University in Montreal. During a research fellowship at Johns Hopkins University in Baltimore, Maryland, Henneman and colleague, Vernon Mountcastle, showed that tactile information about the extremities is represented in an orderly map in the ventrolateral thalamus of the cat and monkey. Further research positions followed, including at the Royal Victorian Hospital and at the Illinois Neuropsychiatric Institute (NPI) in Chicago. At NPI, Henneman discovered that the drug Mephenesin (Myensin) inhibits interneurons in the spinal cord and thus causes muscle relaxation. This discovery helped lead to the development of muscle relaxant drugs.

Of greater impact for the scientific community was Henneman's work describing the physiology of motor neurons, the neurons that control contraction of the muscles. In 1957, Henneman published experimental results that showed that motor neurons that project to the same muscle are recruited on the basis of their size. Henneman's Size Principle describes this relationship.

In 1971, Henneman became chair of the Department of Physiology at Harvard Medical School, a position he held until his retirement in 1984.

== Awards and honors ==
In 1997, Henneman was posthumously elected to the American Academy of Arts and Sciences.

== Death ==
Elwood Henneman died in 1996 at age 80, of heart failure.

== Literature ==
Hans Peter Clamann: Elwood Henneman and the Size Principle. Journal of the history of the neurosciences. Vol. 11, no. 4 (Dec. 2002) p. 420–421.
