= Cervical spine disorder =

- Cervical vertebrae

Cervical spine disorders are illnesses that affect the cervical spine, which is made up of the upper first seven vertebrae, encasing and shielding the spinal cord. This fragment of the spine starts from the region above the shoulder blades and ends by supporting and connecting the skull.

The cervical spine contains many different anatomic compositions, including muscles, bones, ligaments, and joints. All of these structures have nerve endings that can detect painful problems when they occur. Such nerves supply muscular control and sensations to the skull and arms while correspondingly providing our bodies with flexibility and motion. However, if the cervical spine is injured it can cause many minor or traumatic problems, and although these injuries vary specifically they are more commonly known as "cervical spine disorders" as a whole.

== Symptoms ==
It is through upper frontal chest discomfort (also known as cervical angina) and scapular pains which signs of cervical spine disorders are shown. In 1937 a man named Oille was the first to state that these chest pains originated from the cervical nerve root. This new outlook helped shed light on exactly what signs indicated the beginning of these ailments for those with cervical spine disorders. It is now recognized that these patients feel pain, numbness, discomfort, and weakness along with neurological symptoms.

- Numbness Numbness occurs when one develops a "pinched" nerve not allowing for the flow of electrical charges, which may result in the death of the nerve fiber.
- Weakness An individual becomes weak due to the compression of nerves encompassing cervical spine disorders, thus resulting in the inability to move or use arms. Those with such symptoms should seek medical treatment as soon as possible.

=== Complications ===
If not treated right away, there are many consequences and pains various cervical spine disorders can cause.

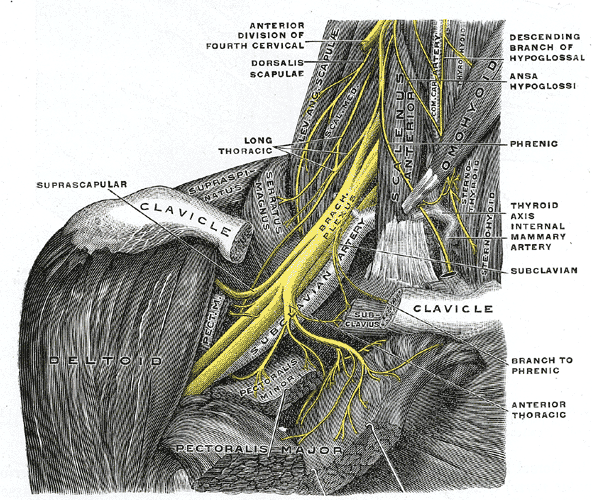
Brachial plexus

- Neck pains Pains in the neck area tend to be tenacious and persistent and most muscles in the cervical spinal region tighten causing for discomfort.
- Headaches Headaches are further triggered through the stiffness of neck muscles, which pull at their attachment to the skull. These headaches are recurrent in nature and start from the base of the skull and emanate upwards; they can be painful or mild.
- Arm pains Muscular spasms within the arm are further common symptoms in which such spasms are seen right above the collarbones and pressure is placed on the Brachial plexus causing arms to feel heavy and ache.
- Difficulty walking Hardships arise with cervical spinal injuries when issues with walking, balancing, and posture are affected all due to the spinal cord being compressed resulting in Myelopathy.
- Those with extremely severe outcomes may result in:Impairment

== Cause ==
There are several conditions and syndromes that can affect the cervical spine and they all vary due to the difference in place and type of injury.

- Rheumatoid arthritis Those affected with rheumatoid arthritis in their cervical spine are known to have neurological deficits. It results in occipital pain and myelopathy.
- Occipito-cervical junction This disorder may result from rheumatoid arthritis, causing the hypermobility of the connection between the neck and head, resulting in paralysis or pain.
- Cerebrovascular disease Cerebrovascular disease is a type of cervical spine disorder that can cause tetraplegia.
- Subaxial cervical spine
- Atlanto-axial joint

=== Age factors ===
- The elderly Because of such symptoms, people often mistake cervical spine disorder indicators for coronary artery disease, and although individuals of any age can develop spine threatening injuries, the people that are affected by it the most are the elderly. This is because as one ages spinal discs that absorb any type of shock wear out increasing elders' chances of developing degenerative alterations in their cervical spine.
- The young Patients younger than eight years old with cervical spinal cord casualties have an increased chance of dying while those older than eight years have similar effects as adults. They are usually immobilized from the shoulder up until consciousness is regained and symptoms are gone.

== Diagnosis ==
The diagnosis process might include a physician who tests that the movement, strength, and sensation of the arms and legs are normal. The spine is examined for its range of motion and any pain that may arise from movement. Blood work might be utilized in addition to radiographic imaging in order to identify spinal cord diseases. Basic imaging techniques, which includes x-ray imaging, can reveal degenerative changes of the spine, while more advanced imaging techniques, such as computed tomography (CT) and magnetic resonance imaging (MRI), can allow visualization of more detailed anatomical structures, including that of the associated nerves and muscles. The most detailed and specific testing is electrodiagnostic, which helps to uncover whether the appropriate electrical signals are being sent to each muscle from the correlate nerves. This aids in localizing a problem's source. There are risks to be considered with any diagnostic testing. For example, in the case of CT imaging, there is obvious benefit over x-ray in that a more thorough picture of the anatomy is exposed, but there is a trade-off in that CT has around a 10-fold increased radiation exposure; alternatively, while MRI provides highly detailed imaging of the anatomy with the benefit of no radiation exposure to the patient, the high cost of this test must be taken into account.

== Treatments ==
If one's symptoms are mild, treatments like Massage, Exercise, and Stress management will suffice in reducing pain and pressure, but those with more severe symptoms are told to undergo unique therapies based on their exact situation. These patients most likely will have their postures and spine alignment fixed, and/or treatments like electrical stimulation may be used to help in reducing pain and aid in flexibility. Medicine, epidural injections and surgeries are also implemented to treat such a disorder.

== See also ==
- Clearing the cervical spine
- Scoliosis
