= Compound muscle action potential =

Medical investigation

The compound muscle action potential (CMAP) or compound motor action potential is an electrodiagnostic medicine investigation (electrical study of muscle function). The CMAP idealizes the summation of a group of almost simultaneous action potentials from several muscle fibers in the same area. These are usually evoked by stimulation of the motor nerve. Patients that suffer from critical illness myopathy, which is a frequent cause of weakness seen in patients in hospital intensive care units, have prolonged compound muscle action potential.
