= Electromyography =

Electrodiagnostic medicine technique

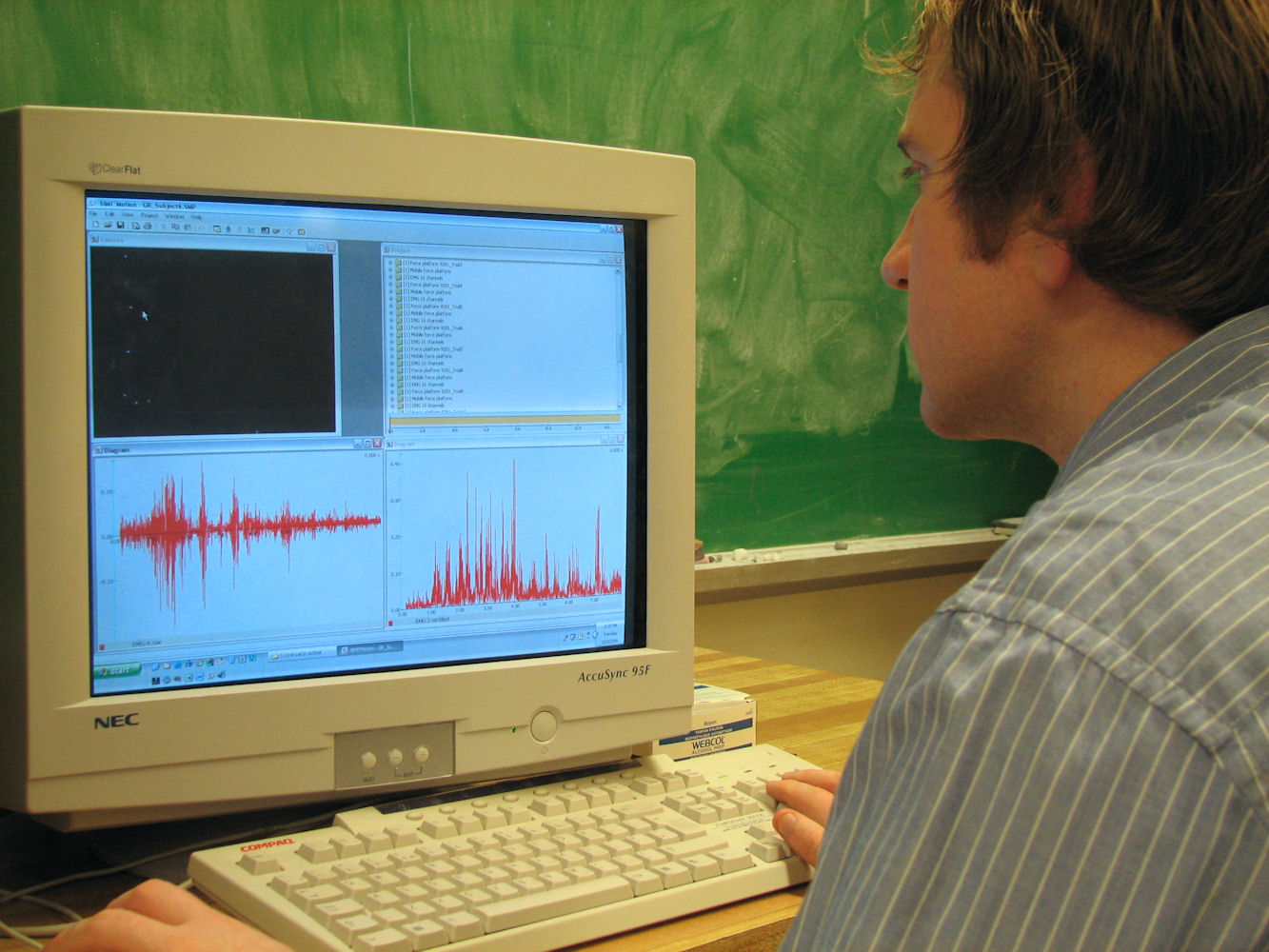
- EMG from gait termination, bottom left is the raw EMG, right is the rectified pattern
- ICD-9-CM: 93.08
- MeSH: D004576

Electromyography (EMG) is a technique for evaluating and recording the electrical activity produced by skeletal muscles. EMG is performed using an instrument called an electromyograph to produce a record called an electromyogram. An electromyograph detects the electric potential generated by muscle cells when these cells are electrically or neurologically activated. The signals can be analyzed to detect abnormalities, activation level, or recruitment order, or to analyze the biomechanics of human or animal movement. Needle EMG is an electrodiagnostic medicine technique commonly used by neurologists. Surface EMG is a non-medical procedure used to assess muscle activation by several professionals, including physiotherapists, kinesiologists and biomedical engineers. In computer science, EMG is also used as middleware in gesture recognition towards allowing the input of physical action to a computer as a form of human-computer interaction.

== Clinical uses ==
EMG testing has a variety of clinical and biomedical applications. Needle EMG is used as a diagnostics tool for identifying neuromuscular diseases, or as a research tool for studying kinesiology, and disorders of motor control. EMG signals are sometimes used to guide botulinum toxin or phenol injections into muscles. Surface EMG is used for functional diagnosis and during instrumental motion analysis. EMG signals are also used as a control signal for prosthetic devices such as prosthetic hands, arms and lower limbs.

An acceleromyograph may be used for neuromuscular monitoring in general anesthesia with neuromuscular-blocking drugs, in order to avoid postoperative residual curarization.

Except in the case of some purely primary myopathic conditions EMG is usually performed with another electrodiagnostic medicine test that measures the conducting function of nerves. This is called nerve conduction study (NCS). Needle EMG and NCSs are typically indicated when there is pain in the limbs, weakness from spinal nerve compression, or concern about some other neurologic injury or disorder. Spinal nerve injury does not cause neck, mid back pain or low back pain, and for this reason, evidence has not shown EMG or NCS to be helpful in diagnosing causes of axial lumbar pain, thoracic pain, or cervical spine pain. Needle EMG may aid with the diagnosis of nerve compression or injury (such as carpal tunnel syndrome), nerve root injury (such as sciatica), and with other problems of the muscles or nerves. Less common medical conditions include amyotrophic lateral sclerosis, myasthenia gravis, and muscular dystrophy.

== Technique ==
=== Skin preparation and risks ===
The first step before insertion of the needle electrode is skin preparation. This typically involves simply cleaning the skin with an alcohol pad.

The actual placement of the needle electrode can be difficult and depends on a number of factors, such as specific muscle selection and the size of that muscle. Proper needle EMG placement is very important for accurate representation of the muscle of interest, although EMG is more effective on superficial muscles as it is unable to bypass the action potentials of superficial muscles and detect deeper muscles. Also, the more body fat an individual has, the weaker the EMG signal. When placing the EMG sensor, the ideal location is at the belly of the muscle: the longitudinal midline. The belly of the muscle can also be thought of as in-between the motor point (middle) of the muscle and the tendonus insertion point.

Cardiac pacemakers and implanted cardiac defibrillators (ICDs) are used increasingly in clinical practice, and no evidence exists indicating that performing routine electrodiagnostic studies on patients with these devices pose a safety hazard. However, there are theoretical concerns that electrical impulses of nerve conduction studies (NCS) could be erroneously sensed by devices and result in unintended inhibition or triggering of output or reprogramming of the device. In general, the closer the stimulation site is to the pacemaker and pacing leads, the greater the chance for inducing a voltage of sufficient amplitude to inhibit the pacemaker. Despite such concerns, no immediate or delayed adverse effects have been reported with routine NCS.

No known contraindications exist for performing needle EMG or NCS on pregnant patients. Additionally, no complications from these procedures have been reported in the literature. Evoked potential testing, likewise, has not been reported to cause any problems when it is performed during pregnancy.

Patients with lymphedema or patients at risk for lymphedema are routinely cautioned to avoid percutaneous procedures in the affected extremity, namely venipuncture, to prevent development or worsening of lymphedema or cellulitis. Despite the potential risk, the evidence for such complications subsequent to venipuncture is limited. No published reports exist of cellulitis, infection, or other complications related to EMG performed in the setting of lymphedema or prior lymph node dissection. However, given the unknown risk of cellulitis in patients with lymphedema, reasonable caution should be exercised in performing needle examinations in lymphedematous regions to avoid complications. In patients with gross edema and taut skin, skin puncture by needle electrodes may result in chronic weeping of serous fluid. The potential bacterial media of such serous fluid and the violation of skin integrity may increase the risk of cellulitis. Before proceeding, the physician should weigh the potential risks of performing the study with the need to obtain the information gained.

=== Surface and intramuscular EMG recording electrodes ===
There are two kinds of EMG: surface EMG and intramuscular EMG. Surface EMG assesses muscle function by recording muscle activity from the surface above the muscle on the skin. Surface EMG can be recorded by a pair of electrodes or by a more complex array of multiple electrodes. More than one electrode is needed because EMG recordings display the potential difference (voltage difference) between two separate electrodes. Limitations of this approach are the fact that surface electrode recordings are restricted to superficial muscles, are influenced by the depth of the subcutaneous tissue at the site of the recording which can be highly variable depending on the weight of a patient, and cannot reliably discriminate between the discharges of adjacent muscles. Specific electrode placements and functional tests have been developed to minimize this risk, thus providing reliable examinations.

Intramuscular EMG can be performed using a variety of different types of recording electrodes. The simplest approach is a monopolar needle electrode. This can be a fine wire inserted into a muscle with a surface electrode as a reference; or two fine wires inserted into muscle referenced to each other. Most commonly fine wire recordings are for research or kinesiology studies. Diagnostic monopolar EMG electrodes are typically insulated and stiff enough to penetrate skin, with only the tip exposed using a surface electrode for reference. Needles for injecting therapeutic botulinum toxin or phenol are typically monopolar electrodes that use a surface reference, in this case, however, the metal shaft of a hypodermic needle, insulated so that only the tip is exposed, is used both to record signals and to inject. Slightly more complex in design is the concentric needle electrode. These needles have a fine wire, embedded in a layer of insulation that fills the barrel of a hypodermic needle, that has an exposed shaft, and the shaft serves as the reference electrode. The exposed tip of the fine wire serves as the active electrode. As a result of this configuration, signals tend to be smaller when recorded from a concentric electrode than when recorded from a monopolar electrode and they are more resistant to electrical artifacts from tissue and measurements tend to be somewhat more reliable. However, because the shaft is exposed throughout its length, superficial muscle activity can contaminate the recording of deeper muscles. Single fiber EMG needle electrodes are designed to have very tiny recording areas, and allow for the discharges of individual muscle fibers to be discriminated.

To perform intramuscular EMG, typically either a monopolar or concentric needle electrode is inserted through the skin into the muscle tissue. The needle is then moved to multiple spots within a relaxed muscle to evaluate both insertional activity and resting activity in the muscle. Normal muscles exhibit a brief burst of muscle fiber activation when stimulated by needle movement, but this rarely lasts more than 100ms. The two most common pathologic types of resting activity in muscle are fasciculation and fibrillation potentials. A fasciculation potential is an involuntary activation of a motor unit within the muscle, sometimes visible with the naked eye as a muscle twitch or by surface electrodes. Fibrillations, however, are detected only by needle EMG, and represent the isolated activation of individual muscle fibers, usually as the result of nerve or muscle disease. Often, fibrillations are triggered by needle movement (insertional activity) and persist for several seconds or more after the movement ceases.

After assessing resting and insertional activity, the electromyographer assess the activity of muscle during voluntary contraction. The shape, size, and frequency of the resulting electrical signals are judged. Then the electrode is retracted a few millimetres, and again the activity is analyzed. This is repeated, sometimes until data on 10–20 motor units have been collected in order to draw conclusions about motor unit function. Each electrode track gives only a very local picture of the activity of the whole muscle. Because skeletal muscles differ in the inner structure, the electrode has to be placed at various locations to obtain an accurate study. For the interpretation of EMG study is important to evaluate parameters of tested muscle motor units. This process may well be partially automated using appropriate software.

Single fiber electromyography assesses the delay between the contractions of individual muscle fibers within a motor unit and is a sensitive test for dysfunction of the neuromuscular junction caused by drugs, poisons, or diseases such as myasthenia gravis. The technique is complicated and typically performed only by individuals with special advanced training.

Surface EMG is used in a number of settings; for example, in the physiotherapy clinic, muscle activation is monitored using surface EMG and patients have an auditory or visual stimulus to help them know when they are activating the muscle (biofeedback). A review of the literature on surface EMG published in 2008, concluded that surface EMG may be useful to detect the presence of neuromuscular disease (level C rating, class III data), but there are insufficient data to support its utility for distinguishing between neuropathic and myopathic conditions or for the diagnosis of specific neuromuscular diseases. EMGs may be useful for additional study of fatigue associated with post-poliomyelitis syndrome and electromechanical function in myotonic dystrophy (level C rating, class III data). Recently, with the rise of technology in sports, sEMG has become an area of focus for coaches to reduce the incidence of soft tissue injury and improve player performance.

Certain US states limit the performance of needle EMG by nonphysicians. New Jersey declared that it cannot be delegated to a physician's assistant. Michigan has passed legislation saying needle EMG is the practice of medicine. Special training in diagnosing medical diseases with EMG is required only in residency and fellowship programs in neurology, clinical neurophysiology, neuromuscular medicine, and physical medicine and rehabilitation. There are certain subspecialists in otolaryngology who have had selective training in performing EMG of the laryngeal muscles, and subspecialists in urology, obstetrics and gynecology who have had selective training in performing EMG of muscles controlling bowel and bladder function.

=== Maximal voluntary contraction ===
One basic function of EMG is to see how well a muscle can be activated. The most common way that can be determined is by performing a maximal voluntary contraction (MVC) of the muscle that is being tested. Each muscle group type has different characteristics, and MVC positions are varied for different muscle group types. Therefore, the researcher should be very careful while choosing the MVC position type to elicit the greater muscle activity level from the subjects.

The types of MVC positions can vary among muscle types, contingent upon the specific muscle group being considered, including trunk muscles, lower limb muscles, and others.

Muscle force, which is measured mechanically, typically correlates highly with measures of EMG activation of muscle. Most commonly this is assessed with surface electrodes, but it should be recognized that these typically record only from muscle fibers in close proximity to the surface.

Several analytical methods for determining muscle activation are commonly used depending on the application. The use of mean EMG activation or the peak contraction value is a debated topic. Most studies commonly use the maximal voluntary contraction as a means of analyzing peak force and force generated by target muscles. According to the article "Peak and average rectified EMG measures: Which method of data reduction should be used for assessing core training exercises?", it was concluded that the "average rectified EMG data (ARV) is significantly less variable when measuring the muscle activity of the core musculature compared to the peak EMG variable." Therefore, these researchers would suggest that "ARV EMG data should be recorded alongside the peak EMG measure when assessing core exercises." Providing the reader with both sets of data would result in enhanced validity of the study and potentially eradicate the contradictions within the research.

=== Other measurements ===
EMG can also be used for indicating the amount of fatigue in a muscle. The following changes in the EMG signal can signify muscle fatigue: an increase in the mean absolute value of the signal, increase in the amplitude and duration of the muscle action potential and an overall shift to lower frequencies. Monitoring the changes of different frequency changes the most common way of using EMG to determine levels of fatigue. The lower conduction velocities enable the slower motor neurons to remain active.

A motor unit is defined as one motor neuron and all of the muscle fibers it innervates. When a motor unit fires, the impulse (called an action potential) is carried down the motor neuron to the muscle. The area where the nerve contacts the muscle is called the neuromuscular junction, or the motor end plate. After the action potential is transmitted across the neuromuscular junction, an action potential is elicited in all of the innervated muscle fibers of that particular motor unit. The sum of all this electrical activity is known as a motor unit action potential (MUAP). This electrophysiologic activity from multiple motor units is the signal typically evaluated during an EMG. The composition of the motor unit, the number of muscle fibres per motor unit, the metabolic type of muscle fibres and many other factors affect the shape of the motor unit potentials in the myogram.

Nerve conduction testing is also often done at the same time as an EMG to diagnose neurological diseases.

Some patients can find the procedure somewhat painful, whereas others experience only a small amount of discomfort when the needle is inserted. The muscle or muscles being tested may be slightly sore for a day or two after the procedure.

=== EMG signal decomposition ===
EMG signals are essentially made up of superimposed motor unit action potentials (MUAPs) from several motor units. For a thorough analysis, the measured EMG signals can be decomposed into their constituent MUAPs. MUAPs from different motor units tend to have different characteristic shapes, while MUAPs recorded by the same electrode from the same motor unit are typically similar. Notably MUAP size and shape depend on where the electrode is located with respect to the fibers and so can appear to be different if the electrode moves position. EMG decomposition is non-trivial, although many methods have been proposed.

=== EMG signal processing ===
Rectification is the translation of the raw EMG signal to a signal with a single polarity, usually positive. The purpose of rectifying the signal is to ensure the signal does not average to zero, due to the raw EMG signal having positive and negative components. Two types of rectification are used: full-wave and half-wave rectification. Full-wave rectification adds the EMG signal below the baseline to the signal above the baseline to make a conditioned signal that is all positive. If the baseline is zero, this is equivalent to taking the absolute value of the signal. This is the preferred method of rectification because it conserves all of the signal energy for analysis. Half-wave rectification discards the portion of the EMG signal that is below the baseline. In doing so, the average of the data is no longer zero therefore it can be used in statistical analyses.

=== Limitations ===
Needle EMG used in clinical settings has practical applications such as helping to discover disease. Needle EMG has limitations, however, in that it does involve voluntary activation of muscle, and as such is less informative in patients unwilling or unable to cooperate, children and infants, and in individuals with paralysis. Surface EMG can have limited applications due to inherent problems associated with surface EMG. Adipose tissue (fat) can affect EMG recordings. Studies show that as adipose tissue increased the active muscle directly below the surface decreased. As adipose tissue increased, the amplitude of the surface EMG signal directly above the center of the active muscle decreased. EMG signal recordings are typically more accurate with individuals who have lower body fat, and more compliant skin, such as young people when compared to old. Muscle cross talk occurs when the EMG signal from one muscle interferes with that of another limiting reliability of the signal of the muscle being tested. Surface EMG is limited due to lack of deep muscles reliability. Deep muscles require intramuscular wires that are intrusive and painful in order to achieve an EMG signal. Surface EMG can measure only superficial muscles and even then it is hard to narrow down the signal to a single muscle.

=== Electrical characteristics ===
The electrical source is the muscle membrane potential of about –90 mV. Measured EMG potentials range between less than 50 μV and up to 30 mV, depending on the muscle under observation.

Typical repetition rate of muscle motor unit firing is about 7–20 Hz, depending on the size of the muscle (eye muscles versus seat (gluteal) muscles), previous axonal damage and other factors. Damage to motor units can be expected at ranges between 450 and 780 mV.

== Procedure outcomes ==
=== Normal results ===
Muscle tissue at rest is normally electrically inactive. After the electrical activity caused by the irritation of needle insertion subsides, the electromyograph should detect no abnormal spontaneous activity (i.e., a muscle at rest should be electrically silent, with the exception of the area of the neuromuscular junction, which is, under normal circumstances, very spontaneously active). When the muscle is voluntarily contracted, action potentials begin to appear. As the strength of the muscle contraction is increased, more and more muscle fibers produce action potentials. When the muscle is fully contracted, there should appear a disorderly group of action potentials of varying rates and amplitudes (a complete recruitment); this can be described as an interference pattern.

=== Abnormal results ===
EMG findings vary with the type of disorder, the duration of the problem, the age of the patient, the degree to which the patient can be cooperative, the type of needle electrode used to study the patient, and sampling error in terms of the number of areas studied within a single muscle and the number of muscles studied overall. Interpreting EMG findings is usually best done by an individual informed by a focused history and physical examination of the patient, and in conjunction with the results of other relevant diagnostic studies performed including most importantly, nerve conduction studies, but also, where appropriate, imaging studies such as MRI and ultrasound, muscle and nerve biopsy, muscle enzymes, and serologic studies.

Abnormal results may be caused by the following medical conditions (please note this is not an exhaustive list of conditions that can result in abnormal EMG studies):

Disorders of muscle:

- Inflammatory myopathies
- Polymyositis
- Dermatomyositis
- Inclusion body myopathy
- Myotonia Congenita
- Muscular dystrophies:
- Duchenne muscular dystrophy
- Becker muscular dystrophy
- Facioscapulohumeral dystrophy
- Limb girdle muscular dystrophy
- Centronuclear myopathy
- Myotonic dystrophy
- Mitochondrial myopathies

Disorders of the neuromuscular junction:

- Myasthenia Gravis
- Lambert–Eaton myasthenic syndrome
- Botulism poisoning
- Organophosphate poisoning
- Hypermagnesemia
- Hypocalcemia

Disorders of nerves:

- Carpal tunnel syndrome
- Ulnar neuropathy at the elbow
- Radial nerve palsy (Saturday night palsy)
- Peroneal (fibular) nerve palsy
- Diabetic neuropathy
- Alcohol related neuropathy
- Nutritional neuropathy
- Amyloid neuropathy
- AIDP
- CIDP
- Bell's palsy
- Laryngeal neuropathy
- Pudendal neuropathy
- Femoral neuropathy
- Sciatic Neuropathy
- Tibial neuropathy
- Tarsal tunnel syndrome
- Charcot-Marie-Tooth syndrome
- Zoster neuropathy
- Oculomotor, Facial, vagal, trigeminal, glossopharyngeal, spinal accessory neuropathies
- Hemifacial spasm
- Multifocal motor neuropathy
- Axillary neuropathy
- Long thoracic neuropathy
- Suprascapular neuropathy
- Toxic neuropathies
- Drug-induced neuropathies
- Complex Regional Pain Syndrome (CRPS)

Plexus disorders:

- Neuralgic Amyotrophy (idiopathic brachial plexitis)
- Traumatic brachial plexopathy
- Lumbosacral radiculopathy
- Hirayama disease

Root disorders:

- Cervical, thoracic, lumbar, sacral radiculopathy
- Spinal stenosis
- Arachnoiditis
- Leptomeningeal disorders

Motor neuron disease

- Amyotrophic lateral sclerosis
- West Nile virus
- Poliomyelitis
- Kennedy's syndrome (Spinobulbar muscular atrophy).

== History ==
The first documented experiments dealing with EMG started with Francesco Redi's works in 1666. Redi discovered a highly specialized muscle of the electric ray fish (Electric Eel) generated electricity. By 1773, Walsh had been able to demonstrate that the eel fish's muscle tissue could generate a spark of electricity. In 1792, a publication entitled De Viribus Electricitatis in Motu Musculari Commentarius appeared, written by Luigi Galvani, in which the author demonstrated that electricity could initiate muscle contraction. Six decades later, in 1849, Emil du Bois-Reymond discovered that it was also possible to record electrical activity during a voluntary muscle contraction. The first actual recording of this activity was made by Marey in 1890, who also introduced the term electromyography. In 1922, Gasser and Erlanger used an oscilloscope to show the electrical signals from muscles. Because of the stochastic nature of the myoelectric signal, only rough information could be obtained from its observation. The capability of detecting electromyographic signals improved steadily from the 1930s through the 1950s, and researchers began to use improved electrodes more widely for the study of muscles. The AANEM was formed in 1953 as one of several currently active medical societies with a special interest in advancing the science and clinical use of the technique. Clinical use of surface EMG (sEMG) for the treatment of more specific disorders began in the 1960s. Hardyck and his researchers were the first (1966) practitioners to use sEMG. In the early 1980s, Cram and Steger introduced a clinical method for scanning a variety of muscles using an EMG sensing device.

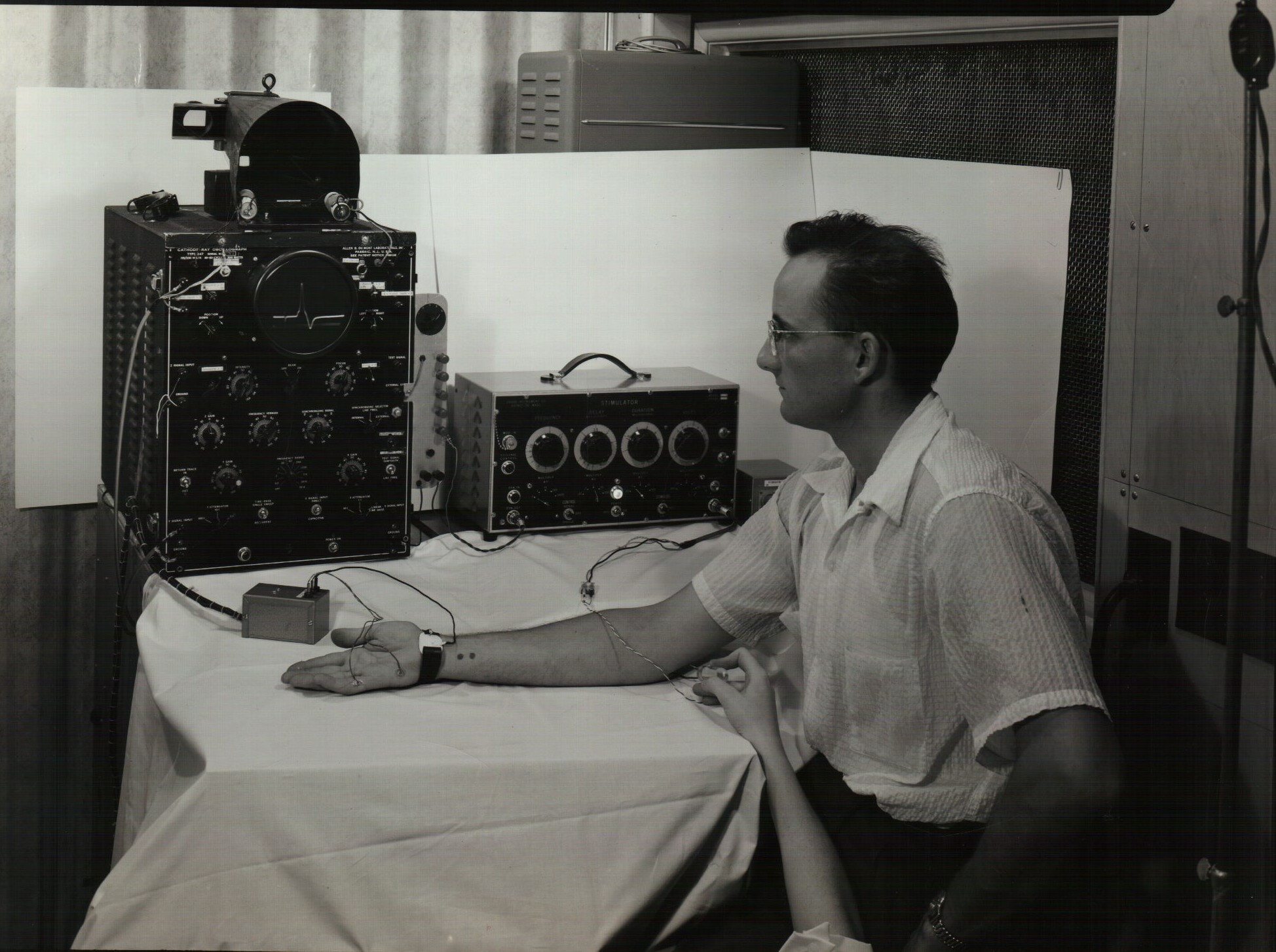
7/12/1954 Mayo Clinic Medical Sciences EMG Lab. Ervin L Schmidt in the chair, Mildred Windesheim's arm holding the electrode.

Research began at the Mayo Clinic in Rochester, Minnesota under the guidance of Edward H. Lambert, MD, PhD (1915–2003) in the early 1950s. Lambert, known as the "Father of EMG", with the assistance of his Research Technician, Ervin L Schmidt, a self taught electrical engineer, developed a machine that could be moved from the EMG Lab, and was relatively easy to use. Oscilloscopes at that time were not able to store or print results, so a Polaroid camera was affixed to the front on a hinge and synchronized to photograph the scan. Fellows studying at Mayo soon learned that this was a tool they wanted, too. As Mayo has no interest in marketing their inventions, Schmidt went on to continue to develop them in his basement for decades, selling them under the name ErMel Inc.

It was not until the middle of the 1980s that integration techniques in electrodes had sufficiently advanced to allow batch production of the required small and lightweight instrumentation and amplifiers. At present, a number of suitable amplifiers are commercially available. In the early 1980s, cables that produced signals in the desired microvolt range became available. Recent research has resulted in a better understanding of the properties of surface EMG recording. Surface electromyography is increasingly used for recording from superficial muscles in clinical or kinesiological protocols, where intramuscular electrodes are used for investigating deep muscles or localized muscle activity.

There are many applications for the use of EMG. EMG is used clinically for the diagnosis of neurological and neuromuscular problems. It is used diagnostically by gait laboratories and by clinicians trained in the use of biofeedback or ergonomic assessment. EMG is also used in many types of research laboratories, including those involved in biomechanics, motor control, neuromuscular physiology, movement disorders, postural control, and physical therapy.

== Research ==
EMG can be used to sense isometric muscular activity where no movement is produced. This enables definition of a class of subtle motionless gestures to control interfaces without being noticed and without disrupting the surrounding environment. These signals can be used to control a prosthesis or as a control signal for an electronic device such as a mobile phone or PDA.

EMG signals have been targeted as control for flight systems. The Human Senses Group at the NASA Ames Research Center at Moffett Field, CA seeks to advance man-machine interfaces by directly connecting a person to a computer. In this project, an EMG signal is used to substitute for mechanical joysticks and keyboards. EMG has also been used in research towards a "wearable cockpit", which employs EMG-based gestures to manipulate switches and control sticks necessary for flight in conjunction with a goggle-based display.

Unvoiced or silent speech recognition recognizes speech by observing the EMG activity of muscles associated with speech. It is targeted for use in noisy environments, and may be helpful for people without vocal cords, with aphasia, with dysphonia, and more.

EMG has also been used as a control signal for computers and other devices. An interface device based on an EMG Switch can be used to control moving objects, such as mobile robots or an electric wheelchair. This may be helpful for individuals that cannot operate a joystick-controlled wheelchair. Surface EMG recordings may also be a suitable control signal for some interactive video games.

A joint project involving Microsoft, the University of Washington in Seattle, and the University of Toronto in Canada has explored using muscle signals from hand gestures as an interface device. A patent based on this research was submitted on June 26, 2008.

In 2016 a startup called Emteq Labs launched a virtual reality headset with embedded EMG sensors for measuring facial expressions. In September 2019 Facebook, later renamed Meta Platforms, bought a startup called CTRL-labs that was working on EMG. In 2024, Meta unveiled augmented reality glasses that were paired with a wristband that reads a user's hand gestures using electromyography. They produced a prototype of the device in 2025, creating ML datasets emg2qwerty and emg2pose, which allow translating EMG signals into typing on a virtual keyboard and estimating pose of a hand. These datasets are open source and consist of 716 hours signal recordings.

== See also ==
- Biofeedback
- Chronaxie
- Compound muscle action potential
- Electrical impedance myography
- Electrical muscle stimulation
- Electrodiagnostic medicine
- Electromyoneurography
- Magnetomyography
- Motor unit
- Nerve conduction study
- Neuromuscular ultrasound
- Phonomyography
