= Electrodiagnostic medicine =

Method of medical diagnosis

Electrodiagnosis
- MeSH: D004568

Electrodiagnosis (EDX) is a method of medical diagnosis that obtains information about diseases by passively recording the electrical activity of body parts (that is, their natural electrophysiology) or by measuring their response to external electrical stimuli (evoked potentials). The most widely used methods of recording spontaneous electrical activity are various forms of electrodiagnostic testing (electrography) such as electrocardiography (ECG), electroencephalography (EEG), and electromyography (EMG). Electrodiagnostic medicine (also EDX) is a medical subspecialty of neurology, clinical neurophysiology, cardiology, and physical medicine and rehabilitation. Electrodiagnostic physicians apply electrophysiologic techniques, including needle electromyography and nerve conduction studies to diagnose, evaluate, and treat people with impairments of the neurologic, neuromuscular, and/or muscular systems. The provision of a quality electrodiagnostic medical evaluation requires extensive scientific knowledge that includes anatomy and physiology of the peripheral nerves and muscles, the physics and biology of the electrical signals generated by muscle and nerve, the instrumentation used to process these signals, and techniques for clinical evaluation of diseases of the peripheral nerves and sensory pathways.

== Training ==
In the United States, neurologists receive training in performing needle electromyography and nerve conduction studies during a fellowship in clinical neurophysiology or neuromuscular medicine. Physical medicine and rehabilitation physicians receive this training during their residency. and can get further training in a neuromuscular fellowship. The American Board of Electrodiagnostic Medicine certifies US physicians in electrodiagnostic medicine. In Europe, nerve conduction studies and electromyography training may be part of neurology, physical medicine and rehabilitation, or clinical neurophysiology training. In the United States, there is also a certification in neuromuscular medicine. This certification is open only to neurologists and physical medicine and rehabilitation specialists that have completed a fellowship in neuromuscular medicine. The neuromuscular medicine examination includes electrodiagnostic testing as part of the certification examination but also includes broader topics such as genetics, biopsy, and rehabilitation. Technologists sometimes assist in the performance of the NCSs but not the interpretation. In the United States, the Current Procedural Terminology code of the American Medical Association, states ""Waveforms must be reviewed on site in real time..." In addition, it states that the "Reports must be prepared on site by the examiner, and consists of the work product of the interpretation of numerous test results...along with summarization of clinical and electrodiagnostic data, and physician or other qualified health care professional interpretation.

Patients will typically be referred to a specialist in electrodiagnostic medicine if they have numbness, tingling, pain, weakness or spasms. Common muscle and nerve disorders seen by these types of specialists include pinched nerves in the neck or back (radiculopathy), carpal tunnel syndrome, and neuropathies. More uncommon diseases include ALS, myasthenia gravis, and chronic inflammatory demyelinating polyneuropathy. Using their broader training, physicians in electrodiagnostic medicine, often perform more detailed evaluations which may include laboratory tests, CT or MRI scans, genetic evaluation, biopsy of nerve, skin, or muscle, or perform neuromuscular ultrasound. A more complete listing of disorders and testing can be found under neuromuscular medicine.

== Relationship to neurophysiology ==
Clinical neurophysiology, is a broader field that includes EEG, intraoperative monitoring, nerve conduction studies, EMG and evoked potentials. The American Board of Psychiatry and Neurology provides certification examination in clinical neurophysiology. The American Board of Electrodiagnostic Medicine provides certification in EDX medicines. The American Board of Clinical Neurophysiology certifies in electroencephalography (EEG), Evoked Potentials (EP), Polysomnography (PSG), Epilepsy Monitoring, and Neurologic Intraoperative Monitoring (NIOM). In the US physicians typically specialize in EEG or EDX medicine but not both.

== History ==
Electrodiagnostic medicine traces its origin back to a 1791 experiment by Luigi Galvani. Galvani depolarized frog leg muscles by using metal rods to make contact with the leg muscles. The development of the oscilloscope in 1897 significantly enhanced the ability of scientists to record signals from nerve and muscle. However, it was the needs of those with severe injuries during World War II that created the field of modern electrodiagnostic medicine. In the early 1950s, the first society dedicated to the development of this field, the AAEE, was founded in Chicago by a group of interested specialists in neurology and physical medicine and rehabilitation. James Golseth was instrumental in creating this organization. Over time, newer techniques, such as somatosensory evoked potentials, single fiber electromyography, autonomic testing, and neuromuscular ultrasound have evolved as useful complementary techniques to nerve conduction studies and electromyography, which remain the core of electrodiagnostic medicine.
