= Nerve compression syndrome =

Symptoms resulting from chronic, direct pressure on a peripheral nerve

- Other names: Entrapment neuropathy
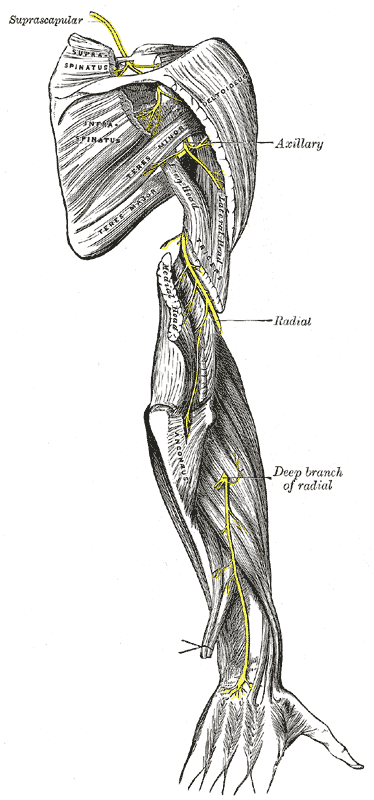
- Radial nerve compression is an example of nerve compression syndrome
- Specialty: Neurology, neurosurgery, orthopedic surgery, plastic surgery, Gynaecology
- Symptoms: pain, tingling, dull ache, numbness, shooting pain, muscle weakness
- Diagnostic method: clinical exam, diagnostic blocks, imaging, and electrophysiology testing

Nerve compression syndrome, or compression neuropathy, or nerve entrapment syndrome, is a medical condition caused by chronic, direct pressure on a peripheral nerve. It is known colloquially as a trapped nerve, though this may also refer to nerve root compression (by a herniated disc, for example). Its symptoms include pain, tingling, numbness and muscle weakness. The symptoms affect just one particular part of the body, depending on which nerve is affected. The diagnosis is largely clinical and can be confirmed with diagnostic nerve blocks. Occasionally imaging and electrophysiology studies aid in the diagnosis. Timely diagnosis is important as untreated chronic nerve compression may cause permanent damage. A surgical nerve decompression can relieve pressure on the nerve but cannot always reverse the physiological changes that occurred before treatment. Nerve injury by a single episode of physical trauma is in one sense an acute compression neuropathy but is not usually included under this heading, as chronic compression takes a unique pathophysiological course.

== Signs and symptoms ==
Symptoms vary depending on whether the affected nerve contains motor and/or sensory fibers. Sensory nerve entrapment presents with paresthesias. These paresthesias may be painful, such as shooting pain, burning, or a dull ache. They may also be pain-free, such as numbness or tingling. Motor nerve entrapment may present with muscle weakness or paralysis for voluntary movements of the innervated muscles. Entrapment of certain pelvic nerves can cause incontinence and/or sexual dysfunction. Positive sensory symptoms are usually the earliest to occur, particularly tingling and neuropathic pain, followed or accompanied by reduced sensation or complete numbness. Muscle weakness and muscle atrophy may only be present if the entrapped nerve has motor fibers (some nerves are only sensory). Weakness and atrophy is a much less common symptom and usually associated with later stages of nerve entrapment if it is present at all.

The distribution of symptoms is highly specific to the nerve entrapped and the way the nerve courses and branches beyond the entrapment point. The sciatic and pudendal nerves, for example, have documented, common anatomic variations. For a given entrapment neuropathy, symptoms will only present in the areas innervated by that nerve and distal to the entrapment point. The symptom distribution is highly dependent on a patient's neuroanatomy, which may mean that two patients can present differently despite having the same nerve entrapped.

The timing/duration of symptoms may be continuous, intermittent, and/or positional. This is dependent on the underlying cause of entrapment and the specific nerves involved. For example, pain while sitting is associated with inferior cluneal nerve entrapment, pudendal nerve entrapment, and anococcyeal nerve entrapment.

== Causes ==
Certain occupations, postures, and activities can put prolonged pressure on a nerve. The term "Saturday night palsy" is used for a radial nerve injury caused by prolonged compression of the nerve at the spiral groove. The origin of the term is due to the association of the condition with a night spent in alcoholic stupor with the arm draped over a chair or bench. Mechanical compression of the radial nerve in the spiral groove can also occur as a result of the continuous use of crutches or prolonged kneeling in a "shooting" position. The so-called "cyclist palsy" is caused by prolonged grip pressures on handlebars, and has been postulated to be an entrapment neuropathy of the ulnar nerve in the Guyon canal of the wrist. Occupational exposure to forceful handgrip work and vibration, such as construction workers, increased the risk for surgical treatment of radial nerve entrapment. Posture induced common peroneal nerve (CPN) palsy is usually produced during the prolonged squatting or habitual leg crossing while seated, especially in Asian culture and is manifested by the onset of foot drop. One sport-related cause of lateral femoral cutaneous nerve entrapment is seen in scuba divers where the weight belt worn around the waist directly compresses the nerve. Prolonged periods of cycling can be associated with pudendal nerve entrapment, as there is often direct compression on the pudendal nerve between the nose of the bicycle seat and pubic bone. Tight fitting goggles can put pressure on the supraorbital nerve, also known as "swimmer's headache". Tight fitting handcuffs can compress the superficial branch of the radial nerve, known by several names such as Cheiralgia paresthetica, Wartenberg's syndrome, and handcuff neuropathy. The use of a thick wallet in the rear pocket can compress the sciatic nerve when sitting.

Nerve compression can be secondary to other medical conditions. Entrapment neuropathies are remarkably common in diabetes. A well defined lesion such as a tumor, hypertrophic muscle, cyst, hernia, hematoma, etc. can increase pressure on surrounding soft tissue, including nerves. Alternatively, there may be expansion of the tissues around a nerve in a space where there is little room for this to occur, as is often the case in carpal tunnel syndrome. This may be due to weight gain or peripheral oedema (especially in pregnancy), or to a specific condition such as acromegaly, hypothyroidism or scleroderma and psoriasis. Abnormal biomechanics can be associated with nerve compression. Ischiofemoral impingement (where the femur and ischium come too close together) can squeeze the sciatic nerve.

Entrapment can be caused by injuries. Surgical injuries can cause entrapment by the development of scar tissue around the nerve as well as the decreased ability of the nerve to glide, increasing strain during movements. Radial nerve entrapment is seen after fracture manipulation when the nerve is unknowingly entrapped between bone and an installed plate, compressed by a bone fragment or if excessive nailing of the bone occurs. Accidents are also associated with nerve entrapment as swelling puts pressure on the nerve and the development of scar tissue nearby may provide a hard surface for the nerve to be squeezed against, such as pudendal neuralgia in cyclists where repetitive trauma creates fibrotic entrapment of the pudendal nerve.

Surgical and anatomic research has shed some light on the proximate causes of entrapment. There are anatomical regions in which segments of peripheral nerves are vulnerable or predisposed to become trapped and suffer from chronic compression. Neural compression occurs especially in osteofibrous tunnels but may also occur at points of passage of the peripheral nerve through the muscles or near a band of fibrous tissue. In sciatic nerve decompression study, compromising structures were piriformis muscle, fibrovascular bundles, and adhesion with scar tissues. In another endoscopic neurolysis study, the presence of fibrovascular bands and bursal tissue was the most common cause, followed by musculotendinous structures.

Genetics may play a role in creating the necessary conditions for entrapment to occur. Previously, physicians thought repetitive wrist and hand motions were the only cause of carpal tunnel syndrome, especially in frequent computer users. But now doctors understand that the syndrome is probably a congenital predisposition in that some individuals have bigger carpal tunnels as compared to others. Gene variants associated with musculoskeletal growth and extracellular matrix architecture have been implicated in carpal tunnel syndrome. A rarer genetic cause is HNPP.

== Pathophysiology ==
Acute and chronic compression of a nerve in a given area can lead to a cascade of physiological changes resulting in impaired function and then anatomical changes in the later stages. Specifically, increased pressure on a nerve compresses the neural microvasculature and alters the blood flow dynamics. Experimental studies suggest a dose response curve such that the greater the duration and amount of pressure, the more significant is neural dysfunction. Prolonged ischaemia and mechanical compromise may induce downstream effects such as inflammation, demyelination, scarring, and eventually axon degeneration. Neuroinflammation sensitizes injured and uninjured axons and nociceptors in target tissue, contributing to neuropathic pain initiation and maintenance. Focal demyelination is a hallmark of entrapment neuropathies, which are often characterized by nerve conduction slowing or block. The initial changes are a break-down in the blood nerve barrier, followed by sub-perineurial edema and fibrosis; localized, then diffuse, demyelination occurs, and finally Wallerian degeneration.

== Diagnosis ==
=== Clinical diagnosis ===
Clinical diagnosis can often identify compression neuropathy on signs and symptoms alone. While there are variations in how nerves course and branch, the anatomical territory of major nerves do not change from patient to patient. Some forms of nerve entrapment can have characteristic symptoms, such as sitting and pudendal pain. Pudendal neuralgia, for example, is diagnosed by the Nantes criteria with four out of five criteria being clinical.

=== Diagnostic nerve blocks ===
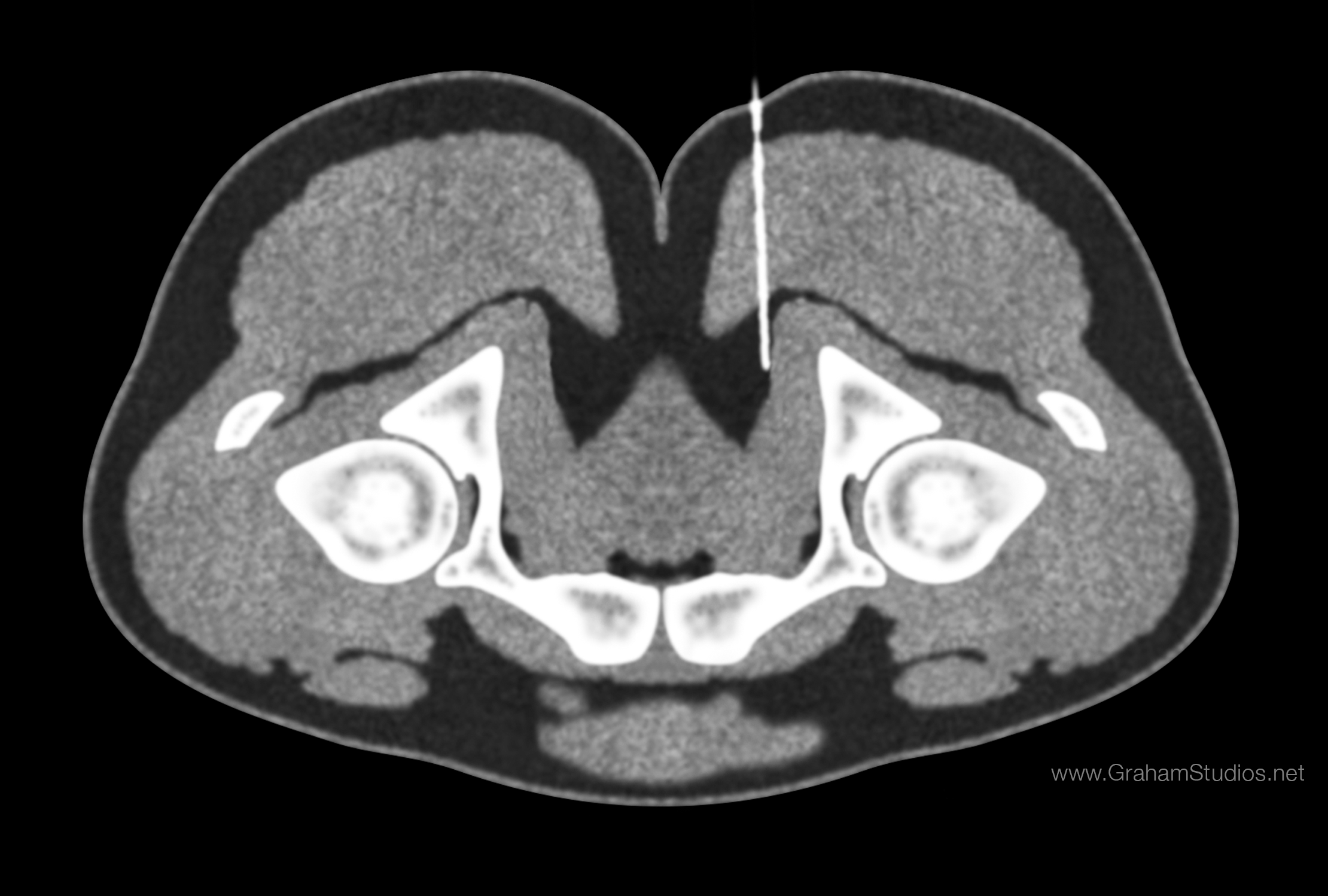
Illustration of imaging from a CT-guided nerve block. The needle tip has been placed at the top of the pudendal canal to block the pudendal nerve.

Diagnostic nerve blocks are very effective for identifying sensory entrapment points. Their strength is that they can directly measure whether a given nerve is contributing pain, or not. They are precise and reproducible. As successful blocks require accurate targeting of the nerve, this is done under image guidance such as fluoroscopy, ultrasound, CT, or MRI. Ultrasound is popular choice because of its soft-tissue contrast, portability, lack of radiation, and low cost, but is not good at depicting deeper structures like the deep pelvic nerves. For deeper structures, CT and MRI are more appropriate, although the equipment is more expensive.

The challenge with diagnostic blocks is that there is often not good information to indicate exactly where the entrapment point may be. For example, symptoms may be poorly localized, and the symptoms may be imprecise. Consequently, multiple blocks may need to be performed on different nerves to find the correct one. A successful diagnostic block will lead to immediate and significant resolution of symptoms up to complete pain relief. The duration of the block will last several hours depending on the anesthetic used.

=== Imaging studies ===
MR and ultrasound can be used for peripheral nerve imaging. Ultrasound is common for superficial nerves of the upper extremity such as carpal tunnel syndrome. MR imaging is not always reliable in that often the clinical assessment and imaging do not match for peripheral neuropathies. That is, there are false positives and false negatives which bring into question how reliable these scans are for diagnosis and surgical planning. There are known limitations of MR for the identification of nerve entrapment:

1. Resolution limitations: Small nerves are fairly resistant to imaging and even structures like the sacrococcygeal plexus can't be seen with MR tractography.
2. Dynamic nature of entrapment: Nerve entrapment can be dynamic where the symptoms can only be elicited with certain movements. MR imaging is done while the patient is lying still and may not be able to reproduce the conditions of entrapment.
3. Focus on structural abnormalities: Nerve entrapment can sometimes result from problems that don't cause visual changes, such as inflammation or the tightness of surrounding tissues.
4. Positional limitations: MRIs are done with the patient lying down. The geometry of the machine does not provide room for the patient to sit or stand during the scan where the symptoms may be reproducible. While sitting and standing MRIs exist, the resolution provided is significantly lower (0.6T vs 3.0T).
5. Poor visibility of entrapping tissue types: MR visualizes soft tissue according to water content. Tissue types with low water content such as fibrotic tissue are resistant to imaging and yet may be highly clinically significant.

Despite these limitations, MR imaging studies can rule out certain causes of entrapment such as a mass lesion. Increasingly used are specialized forms of MRI such as MR neurography (MRN) and MR tractography (MRT). Of the two MRT is more effective as it has a high correlation with intraoperative findings.

=== Electrophysiology studies ===
The main electrophysiological studies are the nerve conduction study (NCS) and electromyography (EMG). The benefit of nerve conduction studies has not been proven beyond distal entrapment neuropathies (carpal tunnel syndrome and cubital tunnel syndrome). An EMG is limited to just providing information on motor nerves, and provides limited information on the location, extent, and etiology of nerve injury. Electrophysiology is not very useful in pelvic sensory neuropathies or for interrogation of the deep pelvic nerves.

The major limitation of extra-operative electrophysiology studies is that they do not have direct access to the nerve. In contrast, intra-operative electrophysiology studies can be done with direct access to the nerve, and this is a useful tool for nerve decompression surgery. During surgery the studies can be used to identify which nerves innervate given myotomes, identify which blood vessels are essential for a nerve, and to compare nerve conduction before and after decompression.

== Treatment ==
When an underlying medical condition is causing the neuropathy, treatment should first be directed at this condition. Several systemic conditions have been implicated in the development of nerve compression syndromes, including diabetes, thyroid disease, heavy alcohol use, generalized edema, and systemic inflammatory disease. There is substantial evidence to support an association between certain work activities and carpal tunnel syndrome that involve repetitive motion. Certain recreational activities such as bicycling are associated with pudendal neuralgia due to increased pressure on Alcock's canal.

Non-surgical treatments includes rest and activity modification, physical therapy, ergonomic modifications, pain management, and steroid blocks. About 50% of the time, symptoms will improve with only conservative measures. Opioids can provide short-term pain relief in highly selected patients. Steroid blocks can have a short-term benefit but have not shown to have long-term therapeutic benefit.

In select cases botox injections may also be an effective option, such as piriformis syndrome or migraines. The effectiveness of botox injections is predicated on muscular entrapment such that atrophying a muscle reduces pressure on a nerve.

The decision to proceed with surgical interventions is a matter of when the severity of subjective symptoms outweighs the potential risks and complications. With muscle wasting or electromyographic evidence of denervation, timely surgical decompression is clearly indicated.

=== Nerve decompression ===
Nerve decompressions aim to surgically access and explore some segment of nerve, removing any tissue that may be causing compression. In this way a nerve decompression can directly address the underlying cause of entrapment. A nerve decompression can either be done by open surgery or laparoscopic surgery. In some cases, like carpal tunnel syndrome, either approach is viable. For deeper nerves, a laparoscopic approach is the only choice. New laparoscopic techniques allow surgeons to get access to previously unreachable pelvic structures such as the sacral plexus. Nerve decompressions and resections are the only treatments with a known cure rate. It is a common clinical experience, that even chronic entrapments with longstanding muscle weakness and sensory disturbances sometimes show a very rapid reversibility of some or all of the symptoms after surgical decompression of the nerve.

A large number of nerve decompression surgeries achieve 25+% cure rate, and 75+% success rate. It is not known why separate surgeries would have similar outcomes.

=== Nerve resection ===
Nerve resections aim to eliminate the dermatome entirely along with any positive sensory symptoms such as pain. While nerve decompression may be used on any nerve, nerve resection should only be used on purely sensory nerves when the loss of sensation is acceptable. The superior cluneal nerves, middle cluneal nerves, posterior femoral cutaneous nerve, lateral femoral cutaneous nerve are all sensory and resection may simply be a more "complete" option, as nerve decompressions can't explore every part of the nerve and may miss some entrapment points. Outcomes for nerve resection is similar to nerve decompression. One disadvantage of nerve resections is that traumatic injury to the nerve is unavoidable, and a neuroma may form at the point of resection. There are surgical approaches to prevent neuroma formation such as targeted muscle reinnervation which have shown very good results, however the risk of neuroma formation is not completely eliminated.

=== Neuromodulation ===
Other surgical treatments include general neuromodulation treatments. Neuromodulation is symptomatic treatment and does not attempt to address the root cause of compression, but rather to alter the signals sent along the nerves to the brain. It can be a suitable choice when the source of compression has been removed, but the positive sensory symptoms such as pain aren't fully resolved. If neuromodulation is used without removing the source of compression, tissue injury might progress leading to worse outcomes when the source of compression is eventually removed. Better known neuromodulation treatments include the spinal cord stimulator and the intrathecal catheter. The disadvantage of these treatments is that they are not targeted for peripheral nerves (implantation is typically in the spinal cord), can only address sensory symptoms, can expose unrelated nerves to injury during implantation if placed in the spine, and have a high failure rate due to device migration. The spinal cord stimulator in particular has a very high complication rate, as high as 40%. Advancements have been made to move these devices closer to peripheral nerves such as peripheral nerve stimulation and the peripheral nerve catheter. A challenge with these new treatment is that peripheral nerves are highly mobile, and it is difficult to fix a wire (called an electrical lead) or tube to something that's constantly moving, and it may migrate after implantation. For example, lead migration is a common long-term complication of both spinal cord stimulators and peripheral nerve stimulators.

== Epidemiology ==
The prevalence of nerve entrapment is not known, however a rough bound can be determined by data on lower and upper estimates. A lower bound is the prevalence of the most common entrapment neuropathy, carpal tunnel syndrome (CTS). The prevalence is measured by sending screen questionnaires to a large random sample of a population, and giving the positive cases a full clinical and electrophysiological investigation. Studies in Sweden, Egypt, and the US have found the same general prevalence for CTS, of between 3.3–3.8%. An upper bound is the prevalence of chronic pain with neuropathic characteristics. Not all neuropathic pain is nerve entrapment, but all nerve entrapment will cause neuropathic symptoms. The most reliable studies have an estimated prevalence of between 6.9–10%.

== History ==
The treatment of each peripheral nerve entrapment has its own history, making any single narrative incomplete.

Theories on the causes of neuropathic pain have been closely intertwined with surgical research in a feedback loop. Theories of neuropathic pain would inform surgical experimentation, and surgical experimentation would lead to observations or discoveries from which new or modified theories would be developed. By the early 20th century the concept of mononeuropathies due to nerve lesions would be discussed (often called nerve palsy, neuropathy, or neuritis), however causes were still debated. One especially poorly understood form of neuropathy was a delayed onset nerve palsy, called tardy nerve palsy. While some cases of tardy nerve palsy could be ascribed to obvious causes such a structural lesion (e.g. broken wrist) or tumors causing compression, many cases of tardy nerve palsy had no clear cause and so were deemed idiopathic (also called spontaneous compression). Various surgical observations led to the theory that the median nerve could be compressed spontaneously under the transverse ligament of the wrist, an area that would later be known as the carpal tunnel in carpal tunnel syndrome. This theory was supported by surgical observations and successfully treated case studies. The development of carpal tunnel syndrome was of particular interest for other idiopathic tardy nerve palsies. Carpal tunnel served as a model for how nerves could be squeezed by narrow anatomic compartments and soon other tunnel syndromes were conceptualized, such as cubital tunnel syndrome, and tarsal tunnel syndrome.

- 1764: Domenico Cotugno describes sciatica as a disease of nervous origin.
- 1881: Lasegue's sign is described for the diagnosis of sciatica.
- 1916: Tardy nerve palsy is described in ulnar nerve.
- 1934: Theory that a spinal disc pressing on the spinal cord can cause sciatica is introduced.
- 1947: Piriformis syndrome is described.
- 1949: Compression at the thoracic outlet is described.
- 1950: Carpal tunnel syndrome is described.
- 1958: Cubital tunnel syndrome is described.
- 1962: Tarsal tunnel syndrome is described; Mechanism of trigeminal neuralgia is described.
- 1987: Pudendal neuralgia is described.
- 1988: Hypothesis that the majority of diabetic peripheral neuropathy symptoms due to multiple nerve entrapments.
- 1992: Magnetic resonance neurography is invented.
- 2008: Nantes criteria is introduced for the clinical diagnosis of pudendal neuralgia.
- Circa 2015: Diffusion tensor imaging matures as a way to image peripheral nerves. There are literature reviews, and it is considered reliable and reproducible.
- 2015: Deep gluteal syndrome is introduced to describe sciatic nerve entrapment in the gluteal space. Neuropelveology is introduced to apply concepts from nerve entrapment to chronic pelvic pain.

== Society and culture ==
=== Controversy ===
Nerve compression syndromes and their surgical treatment has caused controversy across various medical specialties.

In some cases, critics have disputed whether specific pain syndromes (which are now considered nerve compression syndromes) are real clinical entities, especially if the pathophysiology is not well understood. Even when there is agreement that a syndrome exists, there are disputes over the validity of diagnostic criteria as many nerve compression syndromes are partially a diagnosis of exclusion. There has been skepticism over whether these syndromes can be said to really be nerve entrapment, as the diagnosis may be clinical which doesn't necessarily prove nerve compression.

Proponents have alleged that the success of treating a large percent of previously untreatable patients with therapies designed to relieve nerve compression validates the thesis of nerve entrapment. They have noted that nerve compressions are seen in many other nerves, and that we should expect to see some number of patients with entrapments of any given peripheral nerve. Some proponents have noted that failing to mention these syndromes as a real diagnosis is a disservice to the many patients who could benefit from its correct treatment every year.

== Syndromes ==
=== Head ===
nerve	location	usually referred to as
supraorbital nerve	supraorbital notch	migraine / frontal headache
trigeminal nerve	nerve root	trigeminal neuralgia
greater occipital nerve lesser occipital nerve third occipital nerve	occipital notch	occipital neuralgia
glossopharyngeal nerve	nerve root	glossopharyngeal neuralgia

=== Upper limb ===
nerve	location	usually referred to as
Brachial plexus	thoracic outlet	neurogenic thoracic outlet syndrome
Median	carpal tunnel	carpal tunnel syndrome
Median (anterior interosseous)	proximal forearm	anterior interosseous syndrome
Median	pronator teres	pronator teres syndrome
Median	ligament of Struthers	Ligament of Struthers syndrome
Ulnar	cubital tunnel	Cubital tunnel syndrome
Ulnar	Guyon's canal	Guyon's canal syndrome
Radial	axilla	Radial nerve compression
Radial	spiral groove	Radial nerve compression
Radial (Posterior interosseous)	proximal forearm	posterior interosseous nerve entrapment
Radial (Superficial radial)	distal forearm	Wartenberg's Syndrome
Suprascapular	Suprascapular canal	suprascapular nerve entrapment

=== Lower limb, abdomen and pelvis ===
nerve	location	usually referred to as
Common peroneal	fibular neck	peroneal nerve compression
Tibial	tarsal tunnel	tarsal tunnel syndrome
Saphenous	Roof of Adductor canal	Saphenous nerve entrapment syndrome
Lateral cutaneous nerve of thigh	inguinal ligament	meralgia paraesthetica
Sciatic	piriformis	piriformis syndrome
Sciatic	gluteal space	deep gluteal syndrome
Iliohypogastric	lower abdomen	iliohypogastric nerve entrapment
Obturator	obturator canal	obturator nerve entrapment
Pudendal	Alcock's canal	pudendal nerve entrapment
Pudendal	sacrospinous ligament	pudendal nerve entrapment
anterior intercoastal nerves	lateral rectus abdominis muscle	anterior cutaneous nerve entrapment syndrome (ACNES)
posterior femoral cutaneous	gluteal space	posterior femoral cutaneous nerve entrapment
middle cluneal	posterior sacroiliac ligament	middle cluneal nerve entrapment (MCN-E)
sacral plexus (s1–s4)	pelvis	sacral plexus entrapment or lumbosacral plexus entrapment
superior cluneal	posterior iliac crest	super cluneal nerve entrapment (SCN-E)

== See also ==
- Mononeuropathy
- Neuropathy
- Plexopathy
- Radiculopathy
- Peripheral neuropathy
- Sciatica
- Spinal disc herniation
- Piriformis syndrome
- Deep gluteal syndrome
- Carpal tunnel syndrome
- Tarsal tunnel syndrome
- Meralgia paraesthetica
- Thoracic outlet syndrome
- Pudendal nerve entrapment
- Chronic pain
- Neuropathic pain
- Radicular pain
- Muscle weakness
- Foot drop
- Nerve decompression
- Hereditary neuropathy with liability to pressure palsies
- Trigeminal neuralgia
