= Deep gluteal syndrome =

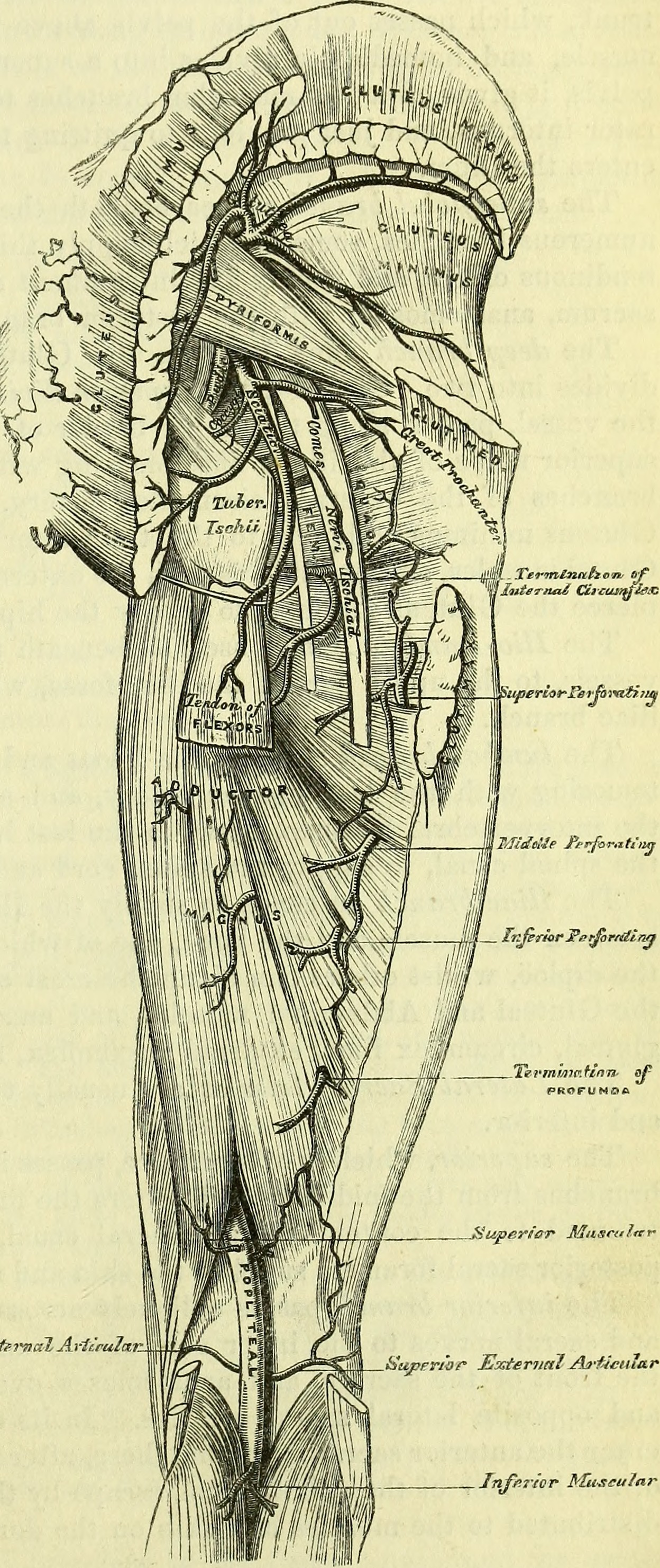
- Deep gluteal space anatomy
- Symptoms: Pain in the hip, buttocks, or thigh. Often pain when sitting or with certain hip movements. Often unilateral radiating pain.
- Causes: Most common are (1) fibrotic adhesions tethering the sciatic nerve and (2) piriformis syndrome.
- Diagnostic method: First ruling out lumbar pathology. Then stretch/activation tests, magnetic resonance imaging / magnetic resonance neurography, and diagnostic injections.
- Differential diagnosis: pudendal nerve entrapment, ischiofemoral impingement, greater trochanter ischial impingement, and ischial tunnel syndrome.
- Treatment: Conservative treatments include physical therapy, analgesics, and injections. Surgical treatment is a sciatic nerve decompression and/or muscle resection.

Deep gluteal syndrome describes pain going down the leg from the lower back due to nerve irritation in the buttocks (rather than the spine or pelvis). In medical terms, this sciatica is non-discogenic extrapelvic entrapment of the sciatic nerve in the deep gluteal space. It is an extension of non-discogenic sciatic nerve entrapment beyond the traditional model of piriformis syndrome. Where sciatic nerve irritation in the buttocks was once thought of as only piriformis muscle, it is now recognized that there are many other causes. Symptoms are pain or dysthesias (abnormal sensation) in the buttocks, hip, and posterior thigh with or without radiating leg pain. Patients often report pain when sitting. The two most common causes are piriformis syndrome and fibrovascular bands (scar tissue), but many other causes exist. Diagnosis is usually done through physical examination, magnetic resonance imaging, magnetic resonance neurography, and diagnostic nerve blocks. Surgical treatment is an endoscopic sciatic nerve decompression where tissue around the sciatic nerve is removed to relieve pressure.

== Gluteal space definition ==
The gluteal space is defined by anatomic landmarks. A simple way to think of the boundaries is the buttocks, or the tissue anterior to the whole of the gluteus maximus muscle. The specific boundaries (top, bottom, left, right, front, back) are defined as

- Posterior (back): the gluteus maximus
- Anterior (front): posterior acetabular column + hip joint capsule + proximal femur
- Lateral (side further from center): gluteal tuberosity + lip of linea aspera
- Medial (side closer to center): sacrotuberous ligament
- Superior (top): inferior margin of the greater sciatic notch
- Inferior (bottom): proximal origin of hamstrings at the ischial tuberosity

== Anatomy ==
The hip has five external rotators: The piriformis, superior gemellus, obturator internus, inferior gemellus, and quadratus femoris. (External rotation is an anatomical term of motion to describe rotation away from the center of the body.) The inferior gluteal nerve/artery, sciatic nerve, pudendal nerve, posterior femoral cutaneous nerve, obturator internus nerve, superior gemellus nerve, quadratus femoris nerve, and inferior gemellus nerves exit the greater sciatic foramen underneath the piriformis. While any of the nerves which exist in this deep gluteal space can be entrapped by deep gluteal space problems, the existing definition of the syndrome tends to focus on sciatic nerve pathology specifically.

== Signs and symptoms ==
As deep gluteal syndrome is defined as entrapment of the sciatic nerve, patients will have pain along the distribution of the nerve, also known as sciatica. These general sciatica symptoms include unilateral, though sometimes bilateral, radiating pain or dysthesias in the affected legs. There may also be abnormal reflexes or weakness of the affected leg. However, significant localized neurological symptoms like foot drop are not typical. Patients also frequently report persistent or intermittent pain or dysthesias in posterior hip, buttocks, or thigh.

Unlike discogenic sciatica (caused by the spine), patients with deep gluteal syndrome report exacerbation of symptoms with pressure in the buttocks, such as tenderness or pain on deep palpation, or pain on prolonged sitting. Often patients will be unable to sit more than 20–30 minutes. When patients sit for long periods of time, they may exhibit the antalgic position, where weight is shifted to avoid pressure on the affected side in the hopes of reducing pain. Pain is often increased by activities or positions involving hip flexion on the affected side. Patients with deep gluteal syndrome may have a history of trauma, such as a fall on the buttocks.

== Causes ==
=== Fibrous bands ===
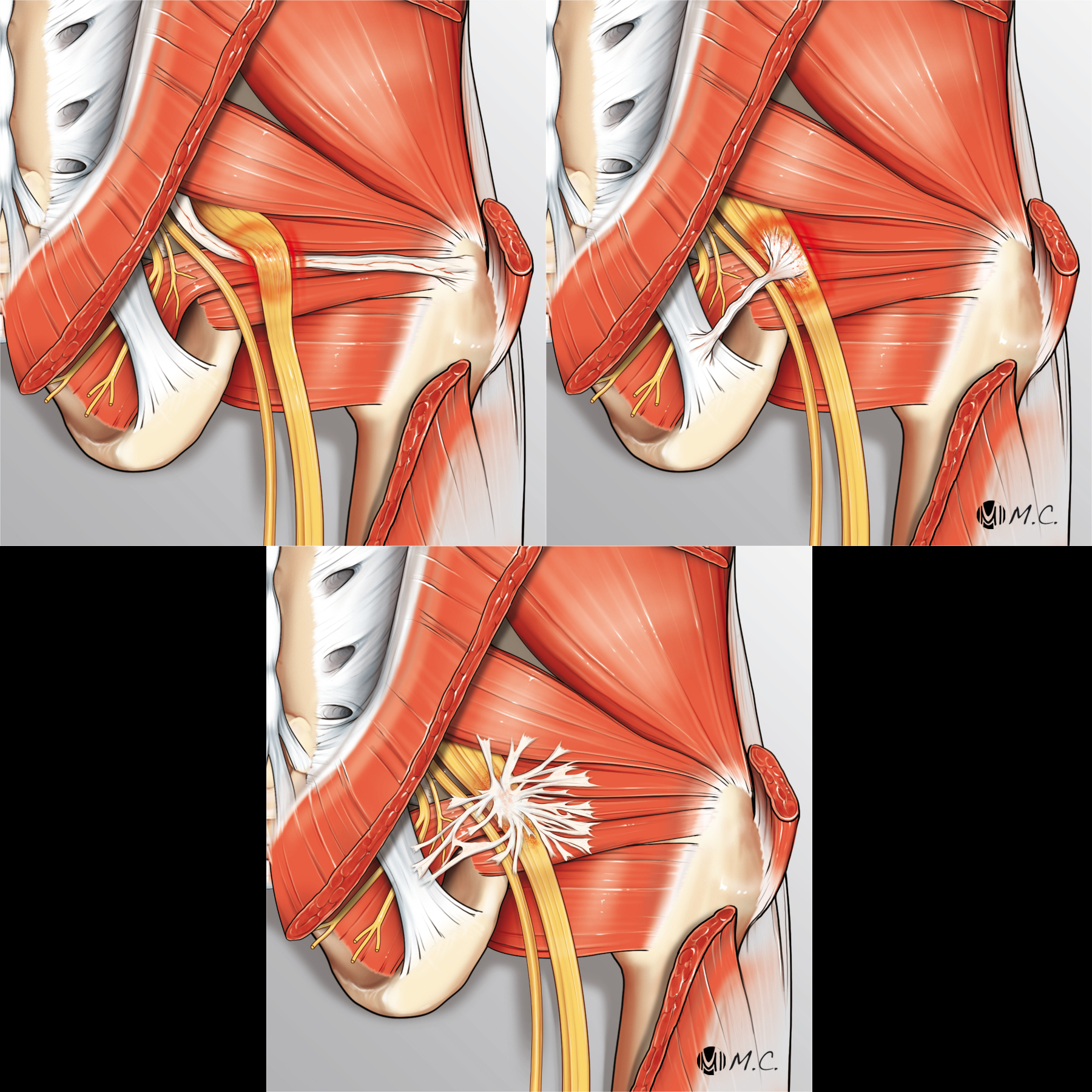
Fibrovascular bands are dense tissue that can restrict mobility of the sciatic nerve causing entrapment. Top left is a compressive / bridge-type band, like a seat belt. Top right is an adhesive / horse-strap band, like a leash. Bottom center is undefined distribution that restricts mobility in multiple directions, like a splattering of glue.

Fibrous bands are the most common cause of deep gluteal syndrome, and are frequently observed intraoperatively during endoscopic sciatic nerve explorations. Fibrous tissue, also known as scar tissue, is dense, inelastic tissue that can form after the body heals from an injury. Fibrous bands are fibrous tissue with a long, thin shape like a rope or a band. It's often not clear how internal scarring would materialize. However, many deep gluteal syndrome patients do have a history of falls or trauma in the gluteal space.

Fibrous bands can be compressive / bridge-type bands, adhesive / horse-strap bands, or have an undefined distribution. The bridge-type bands act as a barrier preventing the sciatic nerve from moving past a given point with compression, like a seat belt. The adhesive bands strongly anchor the nerve and completely limit movement beyond a certain point with traction, like a leash. Fibrous bands with an undefined distribution anchor the sciatic nerve in multiple directions, like glue.

=== Piriformis syndrome ===
Piriformis syndrome is the second most common cause of deep gluteal syndrome, and the most commonly involved among the various musculotendinous structures in the pelvis. There are several mechanisms proposed where the piriformis entraps the sciatic nerve: hypertrophy (muscle size squeezes tissue around it), dynamic nerve entrapment at the muscle (muscle pinches the nerve with certain movements), anomalous course of the nerve, anomalous attachments of the muscle, iatrogenic injury, and trauma. Anatomic variations of sciatic nerve branching were speculated to play a role, however this is unproven, as surgery groups for deep gluteal syndrome tend to have the same prevalence of sciatic nerve branching anomalies found in non-patient cadavers.

=== Other causes ===
There are many other causes of deep gluteal syndrome although less frequent. They include hamstring conditions, gluteal muscles, gemelli-obturator internus syndrome, vascular abnormalities (e.g. dilated veins), quadratus femoris/ischiofemoral impingement, space-occupying lesions (neuroma, ganglion cyst), fibrosis after classic open surgery of piriformis, trauma, and orthopedic causes. Sometimes rare, pathological anatomic variations may be the cause, such as a muscle fiber piercing a nerve.

== Pathophysiology ==
The sciatic nerve is highly mobile in the deep gluteal space with hip and even knee movements. For example, hip flexion with knee extension (also called a straight leg raise) causes the sciatic nerve in the deep gluteal space to move 28mm towards the center of the body. Hip movements may also create dynamic impingement between muscles. For example, hip flexion, adduction, and internal rotation stretch the piriformis muscle and reduce the space between the piriformis and superior gemellus as well as the piriformis and sacrotuberous ligament.

Normally the sciatic nerve can stretch, glide, and accommodate moderate compression associated with normal hip joint and knee movements, but it may be impeded by various pathologies. Diminished or absent sciatic nerve mobility is believed to be the precipitating cause of sciatic neuropathy in deep gluteal syndrome. This impaired mobility induces strain and compression on the sciatic nerve during various hip movements. Even a 6% stretch on a nerve can result in impaired conduction.

== Diagnosis ==
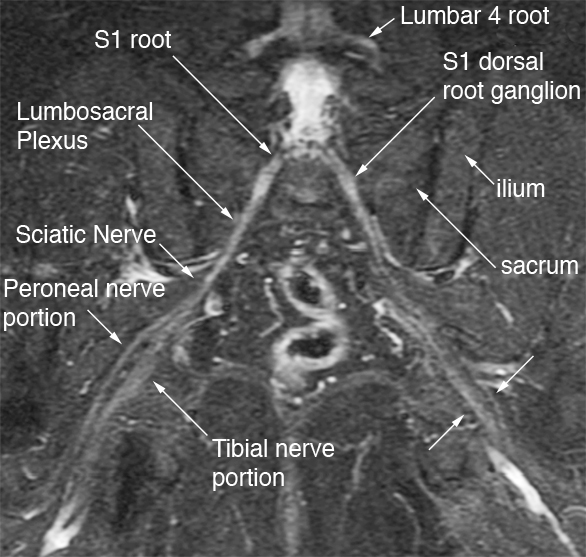
Bilateral magnetic resonance neurography of the sciatic nerves

The general workup involves excluding lumbar, pelvic, and hip pathologies, physical examination, magnetic resonance neurography (MRN) imaging, and diagnostic injections. The use of MRN and diagnostic injections are relatively new diagnostic tools that allow making precise diagnoses where standard diagnostic modalities has failed. Nerve testing such as EMG and NCS can be done but there is little evidence it's helpful. Differential diagnoses (different conditions with similar symptoms) include pudendal nerve entrapment, ischiofemoral impingement, greater trochanter ischial impingement, and ischial tunnel syndrome.

=== Exclude hip/spine/pelvis pathologies early ===
Diagnosing deep gluteal syndrome is often is a clinical challenge because the symptoms can have considerable overlap with symptoms of pelvic, hip, and spine pathology. In particular lumbar pathology should be excluded early as sciatica that originates in the spine is thought to be more common than sciatica that originates in the deep gluteal space. When assessing the possibility of lumbar pathology, magnetic resonance imaging (MRI) should not be the sole basis for a diagnosis as it has very high sensitivity which may cause non-discogenic sciatic nerve entrapment to be overlooked due to false positive diagnosis. On MRI, disc lesions are present in many asymptomatic people.

Intrapelvic problems should be excluded by covering a gynecologic or urologic history. High resolution imaging can also rule out some forms of intrapelvic problems such as endometriosis or vascular abnormalities.

=== Physical examination ===
The clinical signs should determine the diagnostic approach. For example, sitting pain is associated with sciatic nerve entrapment under the piriformis, but pain lateral to the ischium when walking is associated with ischiofemoral impingement. The core of the physical examination is palpation and stretch/activation tests of the external hip rotators.

As patients often have tenderness in the buttocks, palpation can provide information on which structures may be involved. For example, tenderness over the gluteal muscle at the greater sciatic notch may be piriformis syndrome; lateral to the ischial tuberosity may be ischiofemoral impingement; medial to the ischial tuberosity may be pudendal nerve entrapment. Stretch/activation tests of the external hip rotators try to create dynamic impingement with hip/knee movements. The most used ones are the FADIR test (flexion, adduction, and internal rotation), seated piriformis challenge test, and the active piriformis test. Additional tests include Lasegue test (known as the straight leg raise test), Pace's sign, Freiberg's sign, and the Beatty test.

=== Imaging ===
Magnetic resonance imaging (MRI) and magnetic resonance neurography (MRN) are the diagnostic procedures of choice for deep gluteal syndrome. MRN provides additional information that MRI alone can't by visualizing structural properties of the sciatic nerve. As an example of the diagnostic improvement of MRN, when MRI is used to assess piriformis muscle asymmetry, it has 46% sensitivity and 66% specificity for piriformis syndrome. When MRN is used and includes unilateral sciatic nerve hyperintensity at the sciatic notch, the sensitivity increases to 64% and the specificity increases to 93%. MRN's advantage is in identifying anatomic nerve abnormalities by visualizing neural structures such as nerve diameter, nerve fascial edema, fascicular appearance, perifascicular and endoneural signal intensity. Diffusion tensor imaging / Magnetic resonance tractography is expected to be another powerful clinical tool for diagnosis of deep gluteal syndrome because it can reveal additional physiological information about the nerves, but is still in the research phase.

=== Diagnostic injections ===
Image-guided perineural injections of the sciatic nerve are nerve blocks with anesthetic and steroids, and they have both diagnostic and therapeutic function. The blocks are used to localize the source of pain when palpation of internal structures is not possible. The image-guidance is to increase accuracy of the needle placement and visualize the spread of the injected material. Ultrasound-guided injections are the gold standard for differentiating deep gluteal syndrome from other sources of pain. Diagnostic injections function in a similar way to deep palpation. While palpation causes a signal to be sent along a nerve which patients can localize relative to their pain (the spot hurts or it doesn't), anesthetics will block signals sent along nerves. Successful blocks are expected to lead to immediate and complete or near-complete pain relief while unsuccessful blocks are expected to have no improvement in pain. The anesthetics used in nerve blocks are typically a mix of lidocaine and bupivicaine, and the numbness will last for 4–6 hours. Nerve blocks can distinguish between different types of nerve lesions as well as distinguish between sciatic and spinal pathology. Blocks can be repeated on the same area or different areas to increase confidence in the diagnosis (e.g. to rule in the suspected diagnosis and rule out differential diagnoses).

== Treatment ==
The indications for conservative therapy or surgery are not well defined due to a paucity of controlled trials. If patients do not have clear indications for surgery then a gradual approach is recommended where more conservative treatments are tried before more invasive treatments. Despite the recommendation to start with conservative therapy, it fails in as many half of patients with deep gluteal syndrome. In some cases surgery may be immediately indicated, such as imaging finding a mass lesion compressing the sciatic nerve.

=== Conservative therapy ===
The main approaches to conservative treatment of deep gluteal syndrome are rest, activity modification, physical therapy for 6+ weeks, analgesic / anti-inflammatory drugs, and injections. Conservative therapy fails in as many half of patients with deep gluteal syndrome.

The purpose of physical therapy is to restore normal hip and spine biomechanics. This is done by strengthening and stretching the involved muscles (external hip rotators) as well as sciatic nerve glides. There should also be an emphasis on core stabilization (muscles involved in posture, balance, and overall body strength) and flexibility. Compressive, tensile, shearing, and rotatory forces are present during normal movements, and abnormal biomechanics can lead to a pathological distribution of forces leading to stress injuries and scarring of soft tissue. Abnormal biomechanics such as a posterior pelvic tilt can also change the distribution of pressure when sitting both externally and internally. If left untreated, poor biomechanics potentially also lead to compensatory injuries.

Injections are also a first-line therapy. Local anesthetics, corticosteroids, and Botulinum toxin (botox) are frequently used in conditions like piriformis syndrome. Ultrasound-guidance is a popular choice for injections, but injections can also be done under CT or MRI-guidance. Controlled studies have found that for patients with suspected piriformis syndrome, botox injections into the piriformis are more effective than a placebo and also more effective than just an anesthetic block alone. The duration of anesthetics is in hours and consequently the anesthetic alone doesn't lead to long-lasting relief. Corticosteroids are often used for its anti-inflammatory effects which can help when nerves are sensitized due to a nearby local inflammation as well as reducing pressure on a nerve from swelling. The duration of steroid injections is unclear but studies on knee osteoarthritis have reported effects lasting at least 1 week and up to 3 months. Botox will paralyze a muscle which can be helpful for chronic muscle spasms causing dynamic entrapment, or hypertrophy placing pressure on a nerve. Botox will last for about 3 months.

=== Surgery ===
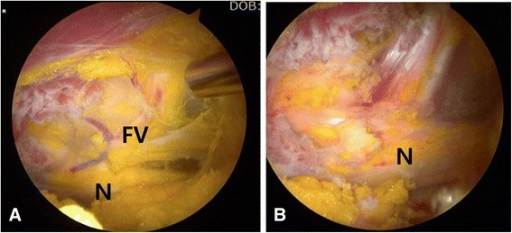
Sciatic nerve entrapment by fibrovascular bands. (a) Endoscopic view of sciatic nerve (N) by fibrovascular bands (FV). (b) Endoscopic view of sciatic nerve (N) after decompression

Surgery involves a nerve decompression with or without muscle resection. The surgery can be performed with external incisions (open surgery) or endoscopically. Endoscopy allows for complete sciatic nerve visualization and access for decompression in the extrapelvic gluteal space. The goal of surgery is to restore normal nerve kinematics and nerve conduction. During surgery this is measured by nerve conduction studies and electromyography, as well as observing the sciatic nerve mobility while the patients hips are moved. This testing can be done before and after the decompression to verify improvement before concluding the surgery.

The outcomes measures include modified hip harris score (mHHS), VAS score (numerical pain scores), and Benson outcomes questionnaire. At a 2 year follow up, 80% of patients demonstrated good-to-excellent Benson ratings postoperatively. In one study assessing 122 patients, for pain assessments, 90% improved, 8% had no change, and 2% were worse. For strength assessments, it's 86% improved, 9% saw no change, and 5% were worse. If patients had numbness, then 59% saw improvement and 41% did not see improvement. VAS score changes are consistently positive, with an average of 6.7 preoperative (moderate-severe pain) to 2.1 postoperative (mild pain). The endoscopic approach has low complication rate (0% major and 1% minor). Open surgery has higher complication rate (1% major and 8% minor). Major complications are potentially life-threatening and require immediate as well as intensive medical interventions, while minor complications are not life-threatening and can be managed with less aggressive treatment.

== Epidemology ==
There's little epidemiological data on deep gluteal syndrome. The main epidemiological data available is on piriformis syndrome. Due to challenges in defining and diagnosing piriformis syndrome, attempts at quantifying its prevalence have led to conflicting estimates. Recent estimates for the prevalence of piriformis syndrome are 6% and 17% of all patients with low back pain / sciatica. However, this may be an underestimate due to the high sensitivity of MRI to identify lumbar pathologies (leading to incorrect discogenic diagnoses), the lower referral rate of deep gluteal syndrome patients to neurosurgeons and orthopedic spine specialists (leading to missed diagnoses), and the frequent failure to recognize the diagnosis.

== History ==
The understanding of sciatica has evolved. Discogenic causes (coming from the spine) were first recognized. Later, piriformis syndrome was proposed as a cause of non-discogenic sciatic nerve entrapment. However, piriformis syndrome remained controversial for many years as a distinct pathophysiological entity because there was no objective diagnostic criteria, no reliable treatment, and no reasonable pathophysiology to support its existence. Over time accurate diagnosis, treatment, and pathophysiology were improved upon. This improved understanding of posterior hip anatomy and nerve kinematics helped to identify other locations the sciatic nerve might be entrapped. The eventual development of endoscopic surgical techniques to explore the sciatic nerve radically changed the understanding of non-discogenic sciatic nerve entrapment. It supported further classification because many other causes were found that did not fit into the traditional model of piriformis syndrome. In particular, the concept of fibrous bands (scar tissue) restricting sciatic nerve mobility and causing entrapment was a radical change in the diagnosis and therapeutic approach to non-discogenic sciatica. The all encompassing term "deep gluteal syndrome" was developed to appreciate the many causes of non-discogenic sciatic nerve entrapment in the deep gluteal space. Piriformis syndrome is now considered one of many causes of deep gluteal syndrome.

- 1947 - Piriformis syndrome described.
- 1999 - Deep gluteal syndrome is proposed to replace piriformis syndrome.
- 2003 - Endoscopic surgery to release the piriformis muscle in the deep gluteal space.
- 2005 - Large study of the diagnosis and treatment of patients with non-discogenic sciatica. Magnetic resonance neurography and image-guided nerve blocks are used to diagnose at least 80% of patients for which standard diagnostic modalities had failed. The various causes of non-discogenic sciatic nerve entrapment are categorized.
- 2011 - Endoscopic surgery to decompress the sciatic nerve in the deep gluteal space.
- 2015 - Definition, diagnosis, treatment, etc. proposed for deep gluteal syndrome.

== Society and culture ==
Patients often face challenges when trying to find accurate diagnosis and surgical treatment for deep gluteal syndrome. Pathologies of the pelvic nerves have historically rarely been seriously explored clinically, even though hundreds of thousands of people with sciatica each year have absent lumbar disc herniation on MRI. Difficult access to the nerves has made clinical assessment, and surgical treatment historically impractical. Unreliable imaging of nerves on standard MRI have made it difficult to establish diagnoses. Consequently, the standard treatment regimen has been to treat symptomatically when no cause is found. However, patients with deep gluteal syndrome can report high VAS scores (6.7 +/-2) characteristic of moderate (>3) and severe pain (>7.5), and may not find sufficient relief in conservative or symptomatic treatment. If patients don't respond to non-opioid therapy, physician reluctance to prescribe opioids for chronic non-malignant pain can leave patients with severe uncontrolled pain that can profoundly impact quality of life.

There is unclear ownership among medical specialties for many entrapment neuropathies which adds additional challenges for patients. For example, entrapment neuropathies require a detailed understanding of neurology and neuropathology, but these specialties are paradoxically rarely involved, especially for the pelvic nerves. Instead, patients with entrapment of the pelvic nerves may see specialists who treat related body parts such as those from urology, gynaecology, physiatry, medical and surgical gastroenterology, and orthopaedic surgery who themselves are hampered by deficient knowledge of nerves and diagnostic tools (magnetic resonance neurography and image-guided nerve blocks). The list of specialties that patients may see for sciatic nerve entrapment also includes neurologists (nerves), neurosurgeons (nerve surgery), spine surgeons (radiculopathy), interventional radiologists (injections), and anesthesiologists (pain management). The lack of clear ownership in treatment can result in patients consulting multiple specialists before finding one with the expertise to address their condition, if they are able to find such a specialist at all. One study author noted that, on average, his patients who were successfully treated for piriformis syndrome saw a mean of 8.5 specialist physicians for their sciatica before his diagnosis was proposed.

== See also ==
- Sciatic nerve
- Sciatica
- Piriformis syndrome
- Gluteal nerve
- Posterior femoral cutaneous nerve
- Pudendal nerve
- Pudendal nerve entrapment
- Nerve compression syndrome
- Nerve decompression
