= Neurography =

Neurography may refer to:

- Nerve conduction study - an electrical test of nerve function
- MR Neurography - A type of magnetic resonance imaging that shows nerves
