= Mir-672 microRNA precursor family =

RNA molecule

mir-672

Identifiers
- Symbol: mir-672
- Rfam: RF00911
- miRBase family: MIPF0000391

Other data
- RNA type: microRNA
- Domain(s): Eukaryota;
- PDB structures: PDBe

In molecular biology mir-672 microRNA is a short RNA molecule. MicroRNAs function to regulate the expression levels of other genes by several mechanisms.

miR-672 is underexpressed in neuroblastoma cells and has been associated with cancer pathways. It has further been identified as one of six miRNAs significantly downregulated in dorsal root ganglia following sciatic nerve entrapment. Additionally, miR-672 has been found to be X-linked and to show preferential expression in testes and ovaries.

== See also ==
- MicroRNA
