= Piriformis syndrome =

- Other names: Deep gluteal syndrome
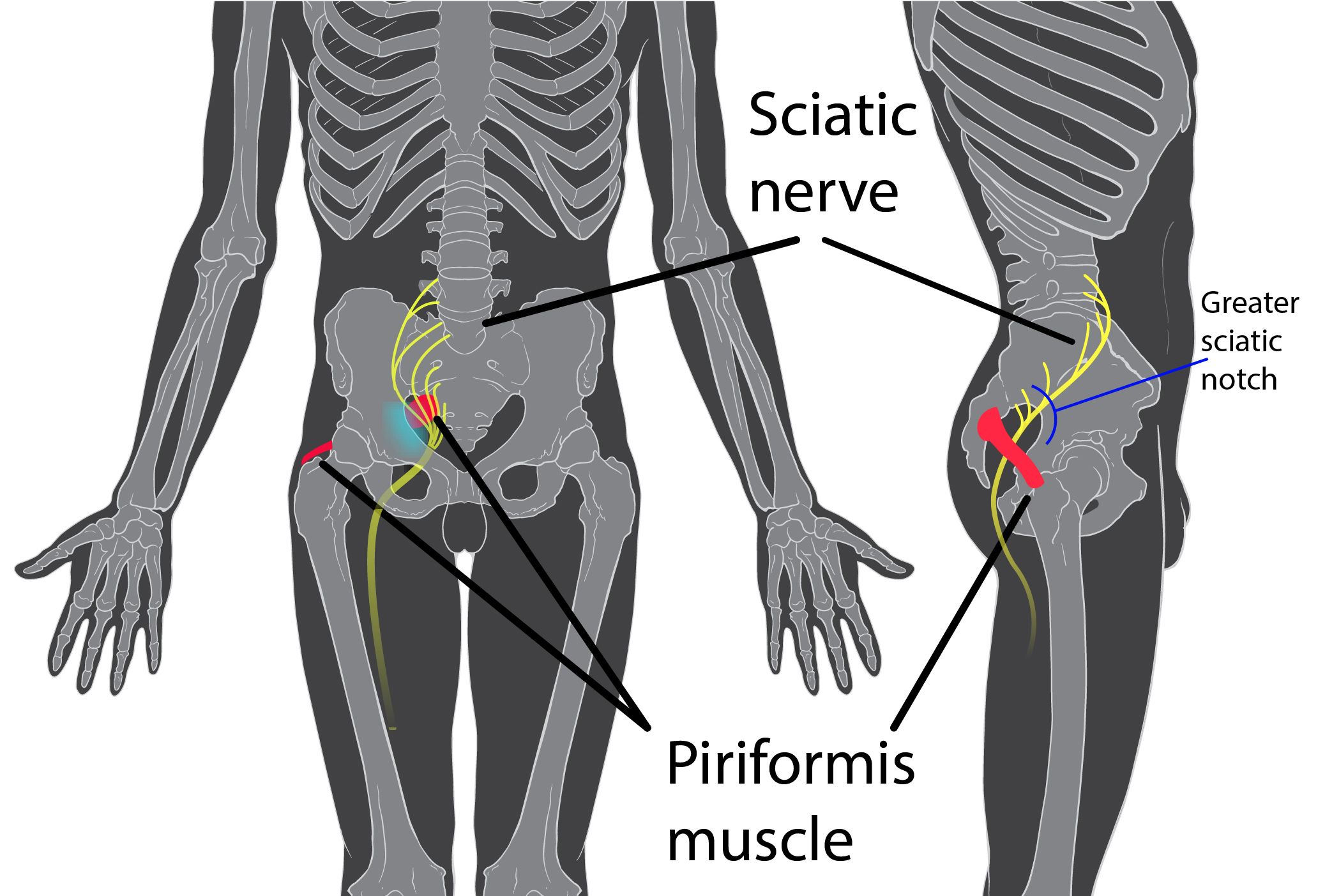
- Location of piriformis syndrome within the body
- Specialty: Orthopedics, sports medicine
- Symptoms: Buttock pain that is worse with sitting
- Duration: Long-term
- Causes: Trauma, spasms, overuse injury
- Diagnostic method: Based on symptoms
- Differential diagnosis: Herniated disc, kidney stones, SI joint dysfunction
- Treatment: Avoiding activities that cause symptoms, stretching, medications
- Medication: NSAIDs, steroids, botulinum toxin injections
- Frequency: Unknown (2017)

Piriformis syndrome is a condition which is believed to result from nerve compression at the sciatic nerve by the piriformis muscle. It is a specific case of deep gluteal syndrome.

The largest and most bulky nerve in the human body is the sciatic nerve. Starting at its origin it is 2 cm wide and 0.5 cm thick. The sciatic nerve forms the roots of L4-S3 segments of the lumbosacral plexus. The nerve will pass inferiorly to the piriformis muscle, in the direction of the lower limb where it divides into common tibial and fibular nerves. Symptoms may include pain and numbness in the buttocks and down the leg. Often symptoms are worsened with sitting or running.

Causes may include trauma to the gluteal muscle, spasms of the piriformis muscle, anatomical variation, or an overuse injury. Few cases in athletics, however, have been described. Diagnosis is difficult as there is no definitive test. A number of physical exam maneuvers can be supportive. Medical imaging is typically normal. Other conditions that may present similarly include a herniated disc.

Treatment may include avoiding activities that cause symptoms, stretching, physiotherapy, and medication such as NSAIDs. Steroid or botulinum toxin injections may be used in those who do not improve. Surgery is not typically recommended. The frequency of the condition is unknown, with different groups arguing it is more or less common.

== Anatomy ==
The piriformis is a flat, pear-shaped muscle. The thicker side of the piriformis is medial (closer to the center of the body). The function of the piriformis is as an external thigh rotator. When the hip is extended, such as standing, the piriformis rotates the thigh outwards. When the hip is flexed, such as sitting, the piriformis abducts the hip (spreading the legs). The piriformis originates at the anterior surface of the sacrum, passes through the greater sciatic foramen, and inserts at the greater trochanter.

The sciatic nerve is the largest peripheral nerve in the body and innervates significant portions of the skin and muscles of the thigh, leg, and foot. The sciatic nerve originates from spinal nerves L4-S3. It forms in the pelvis from nerves of the sacral plexus, and exits the greater sciatic foramen just underneath the piriformis. A number of anatomic variations exist in the branching pattern of sciatic nerve around the piriformis, such as passing over, through, or under the piriformis, as well as early branching into the tibial nerve and common peroneal nerve before passing the piriformis.

== Signs and symptoms ==
Patients with piriformis syndrome may have some of the following symptoms:

- Sciatica, or pain felt in the leg along the distribution of the sciatic nerve
- External tenderness near the greater sciatic notch
- Buttock pain
- Pain on any maneuver that increases piriformis muscle tension
- Pain aggravated on sitting
- Limitation of the straight leg raise

There are also some reports of gluteal atrophy on the same side as the symptoms for chronic cases, but this is less commonly seen.

== Etiology ==
Causes of piriformis syndrome include the following

- Trauma to the hip or buttock area such as a fall is the most common precipitating factor.
- Athletes and weightlifters overtraining or acquiring a repetitive strain injury, causing piriformis irritation or hypertrophy
- Sitting for prolonged periods (office workers, taxi drivers, bicycle riders)
- Anatomic variations which might cause piriformis syndrome have been reported (e.g. sciatic nerve branching, bipartite piriformis muscle); however, comprehensive anatomic data on the piriformis morphology is lacking. In other words, patients with piriformis syndrome sometimes have anatomic variations suggesting a cause, but it's not known if these anatomic variations actually occur more frequently in patients with piriformis syndrome.
- A heavily scrutinized anatomic variation involves sciatic nerve branching around the piriformis using the 6-category classification first described by Beaton and Anson. In this classification, the normal anatomy (type A) seen in about 80% of people is where the sciatic nerve passes under the piriformis muscle at the greater sciatic notch. However, the incidence of atypical anatomic variations (types B-F) has not been found to differ significantly between piriformis syndrome patients and cadavers, leading to doubt about the importance of this anatomic variation in the development of piriformis syndrome.

== Pathophysiology ==
Under certain conditions, the piriformis muscle is believed to compress the sciatic nerve, also known as sciatic nerve entrapment, causing sciatica. The pathophysiology of piriformis syndrome is not completely understood. There are several mechanisms by which the piriformis muscle is thought to be capable of compressing the sciatic nerve, and these mechanisms are not mutually exclusive.

Piriformis muscle spasm may compress the sciatic nerve. As the piriformis muscle spasms, it shortens and becomes harder, applying greater pressure on the sciatic nerve against the ischium at the inferior greater sciatic foramen. The empirical evidence supporting this is that patients can often see immediate and permanent relief from local anesthetic and the effectiveness of Botox injections as a muscle relaxer.

Piriformis muscle hypertrophy may cause crowding around the greater sciatic foramen. Both the piriformis and sciatic nerve pass through the greater sciatic foramen and the deep gluteal space. An enlarged (hypertrophic) piriformis muscle may place pressure on nearby structures. The empirical evidence supporting this is that ipsilateral (same-side) piriformis hypertrophy is a common image finding in piriformis syndrome, and that botox injections reduce symptoms (by paralyzing a muscle for months the muscle shrinks).

A single injury, or many smaller injuries, may predispose the piriformis muscle to fibrosis, making the tissue tougher and tighter, applying greater pressure on the sciatic nerve against the ischium at the greater sciatic foramen. Or the formation of scar tissue from a hematoma might restrict normal movement of the sciatic nerve as it passes by the piriformis muscle.

The piriformis may be capable of dynamically compressing the sciatic nerve with certain hip movements. The empirical evidence supporting this is the presence of electrophysiology testing abnormalities (delayed H reflex) of the sciatic nerve during the FAIR test, as well as the improvement of these electrophysiology results after successful treatment.

== Diagnosis ==
Piriformis syndrome does not yet have a validated set of diagnostic criteria; however, the diagnosis is primarily clinical, involving a physical examination and an evaluation of patient history. Imaging can assist in excluding other conditions with similar symptoms, such as lumbar disc herniation and spinal stenosis. Diagnostic injections of anesthetic into the piriformis may be used to confirm the diagnosis. Often piriformis syndrome is a diagnosis of exclusion.

A complete exam of low back, pelvis, buttocks, lower extremities may be necessary to rule out differential diagnoses. Sciatica secondary to conditions to be ruled out include spinal disc herniation, facet arthropathy, spinal stenosis, lumbar muscle strain, wallet neuritis (sitting on a thick wallet), endometriosis, pelvic tumors, gluteal varicosities, and inferior gluteal artery aneuyrism. Pathology in the sacroiliac joint region, Sacroiliac joint dysfunction and Sacroiliitis are other conditions that present with pain in the low back and hip regions, which may radiate down along the back of the thigh, rarely going down below knee.

The clinical signs may involve unilateral or bilateral buttocks pain that fluctuates throughout the day, the absence of lower back pain, buttocks or sciatica pain when in the sitting position (especially for prolonged periods), sciatic pain with fluctuating periods without pain throughout the day, buttocks pain near the piriformis. The pain may be exacerbated with any activity that causes flexion of the hip such as stooping or lifting.

In a physical exam, the piriformis can be palpated externally though it is so deep that it may not be possible to assess tenderness. If the piriformis can be located it may feel cord-like. Internal palpation is also possible which allows better access to assess piriformis muscle tenderness. There are a number of maneuvers that can be done in an attempt to provoke sciatic nerve compression. These tests either stretch the piriformis or cause the piriformis to contract. The most common tests used are the Freiberg test, FAIR test (flexion, adduction, internal rotation), Beatty test, Pace test, seated piriformis stretch test, and straight leg raise (Lasegue sign).

Diagnostic modalities such as EMG, x-rays, ultrasound, CT, and MRI are mostly used to exclude other conditions. For example, and MRI of the spine can rule out conditions like radiculopathy and spinal stenosis. MRI of the pelvis can rule out conditions like pelvic tumors. MRI and ultrasound can be used to observe side-to-side differences, a common finding where the symptomatic side often exhibits increased piriformis size measured as increased thickness and cross-sectional area. Specialized sequences and protocols of MRI can be used for sciatic nerve imaging, namely MRN (magnetic resonance neurography) and DTI (diffusion tensor imaging). MRN can assess changes in the path, thickness, and signal intensity of the sciatic nerve. DTI uses the anisotropic diffusion of water to assess structural and functional properties of nerves. Both MRN and DTI can localize nerve lesions, their extension, and their spatial distribution due to conditions such as entrapment. MRN and DTI have also been used to visualize sciatic nerve lesions to diagnose of piriformis syndrome. However, magnetic resonance neurography is considered "investigational/not medically necessary" by some insurance companies. Neurography can determine whether or not a patient has a split sciatic nerve or a split piriformis muscle – this may be important in getting a good result from injections or surgery.

Image-guided injections into the piriformis muscle can assist in the diagnosis. Injections usually involve delivering anesthetic to the piriformis muscle to paralyze it. In the event of a piriformis muscle spasm causing sciatic nerve compression, paralyzing the piriformis muscle will temporarily relieve the symptoms. If successful, there should be a complete or near-complete relief of pain for 4–6 hours. Needle guidance can be done with fluoroscopy, ultrasound, CT, or MRI. Ultrasound is a popular choice due to its low cost, lack of radiation, and accessibility, but lacks the spatial resolution of CT/MRI. While there is no gold standard test to diagnose piriformis syndrome, in deep gluteal syndrome, the generalization of extra-spinal sciatica in the deep gluteal space, diagnostic blocks are considered the gold standard for differentiating alternate sources of pain.

== Prevention ==
The most common etiology of piriformis syndrome is that resulting from a specific previous injury due to trauma. Large injuries include trauma to the buttocks while "micro traumas" result from small repeated bouts of stress on the piriformis muscle itself. To the extent that piriformis syndrome is the result of some type of trauma and not neuropathy, such secondary causes are considered preventable, especially those occurring in daily activities: according to this theory, periods of prolonged sitting, especially on hard surfaces, produce minor stress that can be relieved with bouts of standing. An individual's environment, including lifestyle factors and physical activity, determine susceptibility to trauma of any given type. Although empirical research findings on the subject have never been published, many believe that taking sensible precautions during high-impact sports and when working in physically demanding conditions may decrease the risk of experiencing piriformis syndrome, either by forestalling injury to the muscle itself or injury to the nerve root that causes it to spasm. In this vein, proper safety and padded equipment should be worn for protection during any type of regular, firm contact (e.g. American football). In the workplace, individuals are encouraged to make regular assessments of their surroundings and attempt to recognize those things in their routine that may produce micro or macro traumas. No research has substantiated the effectiveness of any such routine, however, and participation in one may do nothing but heighten an individual's sense of worry over physical minutiae while have no effect in reducing the likeliness of experiencing or re-experiencing piriformis syndrome.

Other suggestions from some researchers and physical therapists have included prevention strategies including warming up before physical activity, practising correct exercise form, stretching and doing strength training, though these are often suggested for helping treat or prevent any physical injury and are not piriformis-specific in their approach As with any type of exercise, it is thought that warmups will decrease the risk of injury during flexion or rotation of the hip. Stretching increases range of motion, while strengthening hip adductors and abductors theoretically allows the piriformis to tolerate trauma more readily.

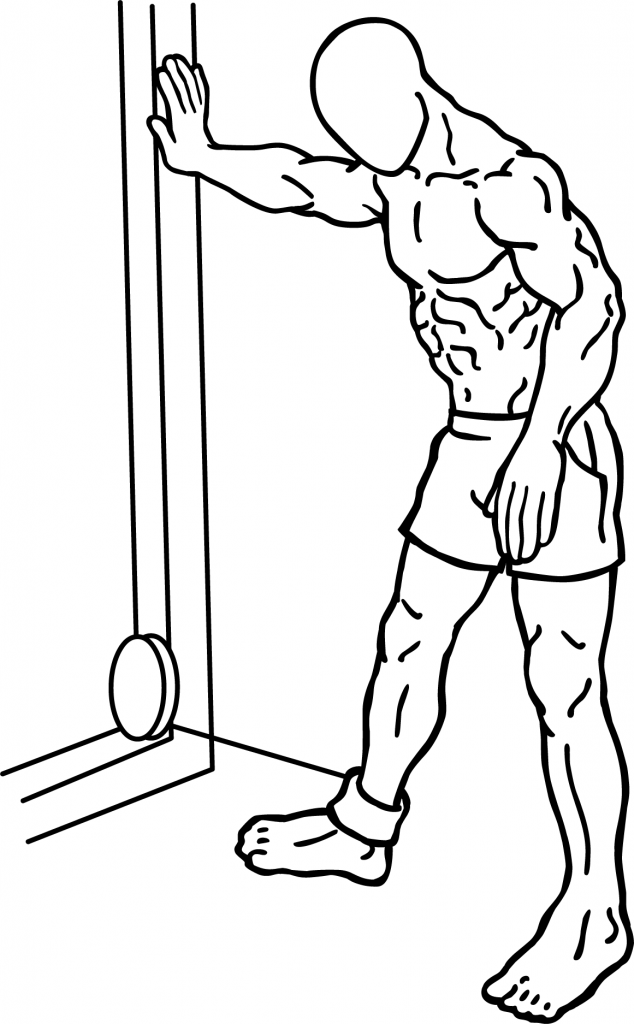
Hip adduction is a strengthening exercise for the piriformis muscle. A cable attached at the ankle can be used to adduct the hip, bringing the leg in toward the opposite side of the body. The same equipment can also be used for hip abduction, where the leg starts beside the opposing leg and moves out to the side, away from the body.

== Treatment ==
The initial treatments are often focused on avoiding/relieving pain such as activity modification (e.g. avoidance of activities that cause pain), heat/ice, NSAIDs, analgesics, muscle relaxants, and medications for neuropathic pain. Physical therapy, especially piriformis stretching, is often done concomitantly while treating pain. When physical therapy has failed patients, injections into the piriformis muscle using some combination of anesthetic/steroids/botox may be considered. In refractory cases, surgery may be indicated where the sciatic nerve is dissected or the piriformis muscle/tendon is cut.

Data on treatment outcomes is very limited. In a study of 42 patients with clinically suspected piriformis syndrome with normal MRI/CT imaging findings, 41 saw complete resolution of symptoms within 36 days. Of those 41 patients, 19 had spontaneous resolution of symptoms (46%), 13 improved with NSAIDs only (32%), and 9 improved with NSAIDs and physical therapy (22%). In a study of 14 patients, all (100%) saw improvement with physical therapy and/or injections. Of these patients, 9 (64%) improved with physical therapy alone. The remaining 5 (36%) improved with injections (steroids or ozone). However, 6 months after the end of treatment, only 5/14 patients (36%) had complete resolution of pain. In a study of 250 patients, medication and physical therapy led to complete pain relief in 51% of patients. Of those who did not see improvement with physical therapy, botox injections led to greater than 50% pain relief in 77% of patients. Of those who also did not see improvement with injections, surgery led to greater than 50% pain relief in 79% of patients. Some caution should be applied in interpreting these results as therapy is usually not compared to an untreated control group (patients sometimes get better on their own without treatment), and the diagnosis of piriformis syndrome isn't validated (meaning different studies can select patients differently).

=== Physical therapy ===
Physical therapy for piriformis syndrome follows general rehabilitation principles for musculoskeletal conditions. The goals of physical therapy are to reduce piriformis muscle tightness, improve spine/hip/pelvis mobility, and restore normal biomechanics to the spine/hip/pelvis.

The rehabilitative protocol usually involves piriformis stretching, gluteal muscle massage (to massage the piriformis below it), lumbosacral stabilization (e.g. abdominal muscle exercises, spine stretching), hip strengthening/stretching, and the correction of biomechanical errors. Direct application of heat and ultrasound (which generates heat) and are often suggested before physical therapy. Heat will enhance muscle elasticity and blood flow, which helps to increase the efficacy of stretching. Piriformis stretching is meant to reduce muscle tightness and lengthen the muscle which may relieve pressure on the sciatic nerve. Massage is meant to break up trigger points, increase blood circulation, and lengthen the muscle fibers. Strengthening abdominal muscles (part of core stabilization) is to improve spine stability and to avoid compensatory tension on the hip and buttocks. Stretching the spine and hip muscles is meant to increase flexibility and range of motion. The purpose of correcting poor biomechanics in the hip/pelvis/spine is that they move in coordination, so a biomechanical error may have cascading effects.

In one study, the cure rate of physiotherapy for 250 piriformis syndrome patients was found to be approximately 50% after three months. However, this study did not use a control group for physiotherapy and so this may simply reflect the natural history of the syndrome. In other words, patients may often just get better on their own without any particular treatment. The exact benefits of physiotherapy for piriformis syndrome are unclear as well-designed, randomized trials are extremely limited.

=== Local injections ===
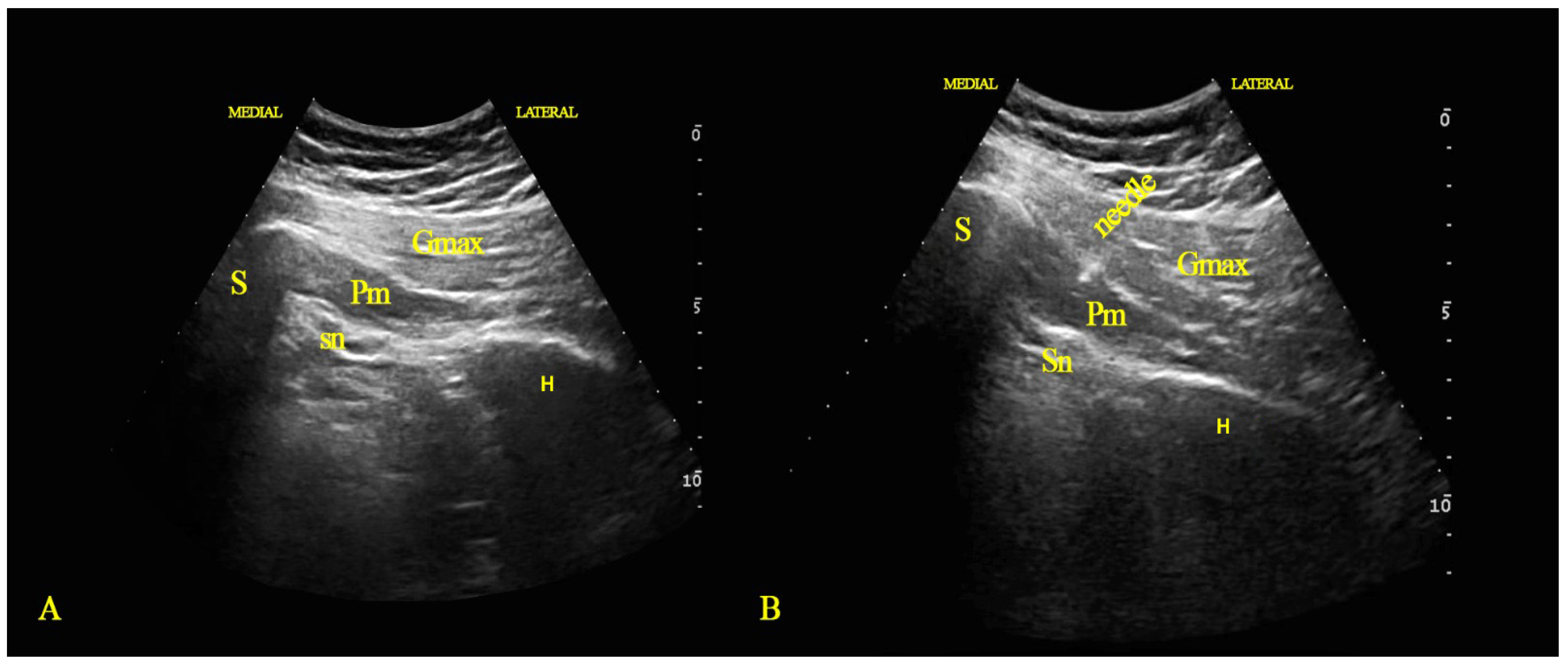
Ultrasound scan (left) and ultrasound-guided injection (right) of the piriformis muscle. Gmax = gluteus maximus; Pm = piriformis muscle; sn = sciatic nerve; S = sacrum; H = hip bone.

Injections are part of multi-modal therapy and can be therapeutic. They may be used with conservative treatments like physical therapy or after the failure of conservative treatments. Injections deliver medication directly to the piriformis muscle through a needle. The needle is placed into the piriformis muscle with image guidance such as fluoroscopy, ultrasound, CT, or MRI. Ultrasound is a popular choice due to a balance of accuracy, accessibility, lack of radiation exposure, and affordability.

The medications injected are local anesthetics (e.g. lidocaine, bupivacaine), corticosteroids, and Botulinum toxin (Botox, BTX), which may be used together or in combination. Local anesthetic will temporarily paralyze a muscle in the hope that it breaks the cycle of chronic muscle spasm. The duration is in hours and consequently doesn't lead to long lasting relief from the direct action of the anesthetic. Corticosteroids is used for its anti-inflammatory effects. The duration is unclear but somewhere between 1 week and 3 months. Botulinum Toxin will paralyze a muscle with a much longer duration than local anesthetics, up to 3 months. By paralyzing a muscle for so long the muscle will atrophy (shrink in size), reducing pressure on nearby structures such as the sciatic nerve. In addition to helping break the cycle of chronic muscle spasms, it reverses piriformis hypertrophy where the muscle is enlarged and presses on the sciatic nerve. Though the piriformis muscle becomes inactivated for months, the loss of piriformis muscle function does not cause any deficit in strength or gait as the surrounding muscles quickly take over its role.

Typically the combination of therapies is local anesthetics with corticosteroids (LA+CS), or Botulinum toxin (BTX). Both are more effective than placebo. Comparing local anesthetic with corticosteroids against Botulinum toxin is difficult because existing studies tend to lack controls which means that the effect of the treatment under observation is confounded with the natural history of the disease (patients with piriformis syndrome often see their symptoms resolve even without treatment). When comparative studies exist, Botulinum toxin is found to be more effective and local anesthetic with corticosteroids.

Injections may be more or less curative (with no return to pain), or may have limited timespans of effectiveness.

=== Surgery ===
Surgical intervention may be considered when conservative treatments fail. Surgery for piriformis syndrome involves resection of the piriformis tendon (or muscle) and a sciatic nerve decompression. This surgery can be done with open surgery or endoscopically. While there is no difference seen in outcomes between open and endoscopic surgery, the endoscopic approach has a lower complication rate and is significantly less invasive (open surgery can involve a 10 cm incision).

Piriformis syndrome surgery is still in the preliminary stages and so there are no randomized, prospective trials or cross-sectional studies. Existing evidence is largely retrospective studies and systematic reviews of those studies. Surgical outcomes are typically assessed by VAS scores (numerical pain scores) and various questionnaires (e.g. Oswestry Disability Index), potentially with a follow up of up to 2 years; however, no validated outcome measure exists.

For surgery, results typically show that at least 80% of patients see improvement. When VAS scores (pain scores) are measured, patients typically have severe pain (>7.5) before surgery and at most mild pain (< 3.5) after surgery. A systematic review of deep gluteal syndrome (of which piriformis syndrome is a major cause) found consistently positive results for surgeries in the included studies.

Failure may in part be due to an incorrect diagnosis. Piriformis syndrome does not have well-validated diagnostic criteria and consequently some patients being treated for piriformis syndrome may have a different underlying condition with a similar symptom profile.

== Epidemiology ==
Piriformis syndrome (PS) data is often confused with other conditions due to differences in definitions, survey methods and whether or not occupational groups or general population are surveyed. This causes a lack of group harmony about the diagnosis and treatment of PS, affecting its epidemiology. In a study, 0.33% of 1293 patients with low back pain cited an incident for PS. A separate study showed 6% of 750 patients with the same incidence. About 6–8% of low back pain occurrences were attributed to PS, though other reports concluded about 5–36%. In a survey conducted on the general population, 12.2–27% included a lifetime occurrence of PS, while 2.2–19.5% showed an annual occurrence. However, further studies show that the proportion of the sciatica, in terms of PS, is about 0.1% in orthopaedic practice. This is more common in women with a ratio of 3 to 1 and most likely due to the wider quadriceps femoris muscle angle in the os coxae. Between the years of 1991 and 1994, self-selecting patients seeking piriformis syndrome treatment from a group of American physicians had the following distribution: 75% were in New York, Connecticut, New Jersey, Pennsylvania; 20% in other American urban centers; and 5% in North and South America, Europe, Asia, Africa and Australia. The common ages of occurrence happen between thirty and forty, and are scarcely found in patients younger than twenty; this has been known to affect all lifestyles.

Piriformis syndrome is often left undiagnosed and mistaken with other pains due to similar symptoms with back pain, quadriceps pain, lower leg pain, and buttock pain. These symptoms include tenderness, tingling and numbness initiating in low back and buttock area and then radiating down to the thigh and to the leg. A precise test for piriformis syndrome has not yet been developed and thus hard to diagnose this pain. The pain is often initiated by sitting and walking for a longer period. In 2012, one study found that 17.2% of low back pain patients met a clinical diagnosis for piriformis syndrome. Piriformis syndrome does not occur in children, and is mostly seen in women of age between thirty and forty. This is due to hormone changes throughout their life, especially during pregnancy, where muscles around the pelvis, including piriformis muscles, tense up to stabilize the area for birth. In 2011, out of 263 patients between the ages of 45 and 84 treated for piriformis syndrome, 53.3% were female. Females are two times more likely to develop piriformis syndrome than males. Moreover, females had longer stay in hospital during 2011 due to high prevalence of the pain in females. The average cost of treatment was $29,070 for hospitalizing average 4 days.

== History ==
The history of piriformis syndrome is interrelated to advances in understanding causes of sciatica. In 1933, the proposal of disc herniation as a cause of sciatica shifted attention to the spine. Although the concept of piriformis syndrome was conceptualized as early as 1928, the incompletely understood pathology and lack of clear diagnostic criteria made this syndrome highly controversial. Advancements in medical technology like anesthesia, antibiotics, electrophysiology, imaging, image-guided injections, and surgery have revived interest around piriformis syndrome. Recently, advances in endoscopic surgery led to discoveries suggesting a broader classification was necessary to describe all the causes of sciatic nerve entrapment in the deep gluteal space. This broader classification is now called deep gluteal syndrome, of which piriformis syndrome is one cause.

Today, piriformis syndrome is in the same place herniated disk once were – there is a link between the pathophysiology and the symptoms (it is clear why the most studied treatments work), but piriformis syndrome does not have a clear set of diagnostic criteria and a known prevalence. Controlled trials are unlikely to proceed without a sufficiently high prevalence and reliable diagnosis; however, the prevalence cannot be determined without a reliable method of diagnosis.

== See also ==
- Deep gluteal syndrome
- Sciatica
- Nerve compression syndrome
- Piriformis muscle
- Sciatic nerve
- Muscle spasm
