= Sciatica =

Lower-back pain that can extend down the leg

- Other names: Sciatic neuritis, sciatic neuralgia, lumbar radiculopathy, radicular leg pain
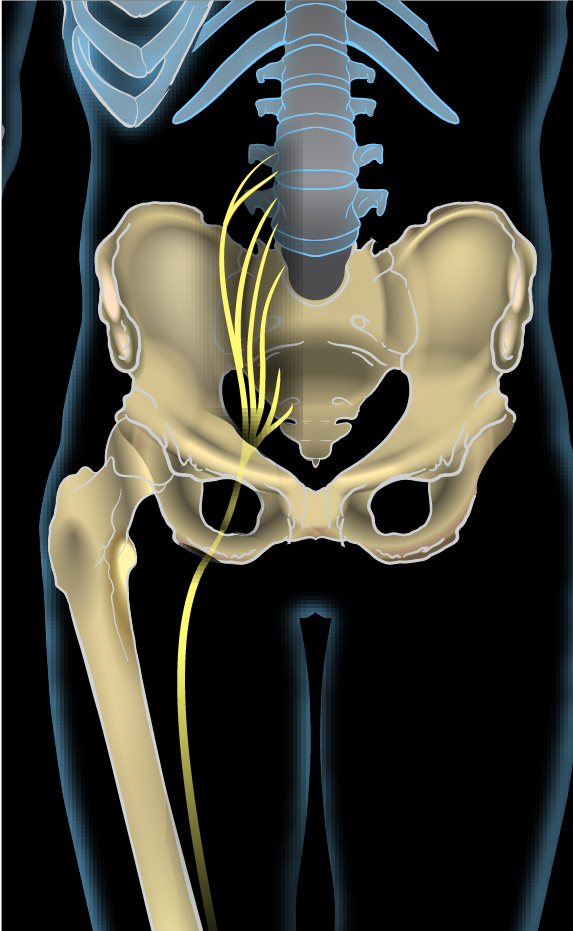
- Anterior view showing the sciatic nerve going down the right leg
- Pronunciation: /saɪˈætɪkə/ sy-AT-ik-ə
- Specialty: Orthopedics, neurology
- Symptoms: Pain going down the leg from the lower back, weakness or numbness of the affected leg
- Complications: Loss of bowel or bladder control
- Usual onset: 40s–50s
- Duration: 90% of the time less than 6 weeks
- Causes: Spinal disc herniation, spondylolisthesis, spinal stenosis, piriformis syndrome, pelvic tumor
- Diagnostic method: Straight-leg-raising test
- Differential diagnosis: Shingles, diseases of the hip
- Treatment: Pain medications, surgery, physical rehabilitation
- Frequency: 2–40% of people at some time

Sciatica is pain going down the leg from the lower back. This pain may extend down the back, outside, or front of the leg. The onset is often sudden following activities such as heavy lifting, although it may also occur gradually. The pain is often described as shooting. Typically, symptoms occur on only one side of the body; certain causes, however, may result in pain on both sides. Lower back pain is sometimes present. Weakness or numbness may occur in different parts of the affected leg and foot.

About 90% of sciatica is due to a spinal disc herniation pressing on one of the lumbar or sacral nerve roots. Spondylolisthesis, spinal stenosis, piriformis syndrome, pelvic tumors, and pregnancy are other possible causes of sciatica. The straight-leg-raising test is often helpful in diagnosis. The test is positive if, when the leg is raised while a person is lying on their back, pain shoots below the knee. In most cases medical imaging is not needed. However, imaging may be obtained if bowel or bladder function is affected, there is significant loss of feeling or weakness, symptoms are long standing, or there is a concern for tumor or infection. Conditions that can present similarly are diseases of the hip and infections such as early shingles (prior to rash formation).

Initial treatment typically consists of pain medications. However, evidence for effectiveness of pain medication, and of muscle relaxants, is lacking. It is generally recommended that people continue with normal activity to the best of their abilities. Often all that is required for resolution of sciatica is time; in about 90% of cases, symptoms resolve in less than six weeks. If the pain is severe and lasts for more than six weeks, surgery may be an option. While surgery often speeds pain improvement, its long term benefits are unclear. Surgery may be required if complications occur, such as loss of normal bowel or bladder function. Many treatments, including corticosteroids, gabapentin, pregabalin, acupuncture, heat or ice, and spinal manipulation, have only limited or poor evidence supporting their use.

Depending on how it is defined, less than 1% to 40% of people have sciatica at some point in time. Sciatica is most common between the ages of 40 and 59, and men are more frequently affected than women. The condition has been known since ancient times. The first known modern use of the word sciatica dates from 1451, although Dioscorides (1st-century CE) mentions it in his Materia Medica.

== Definition ==
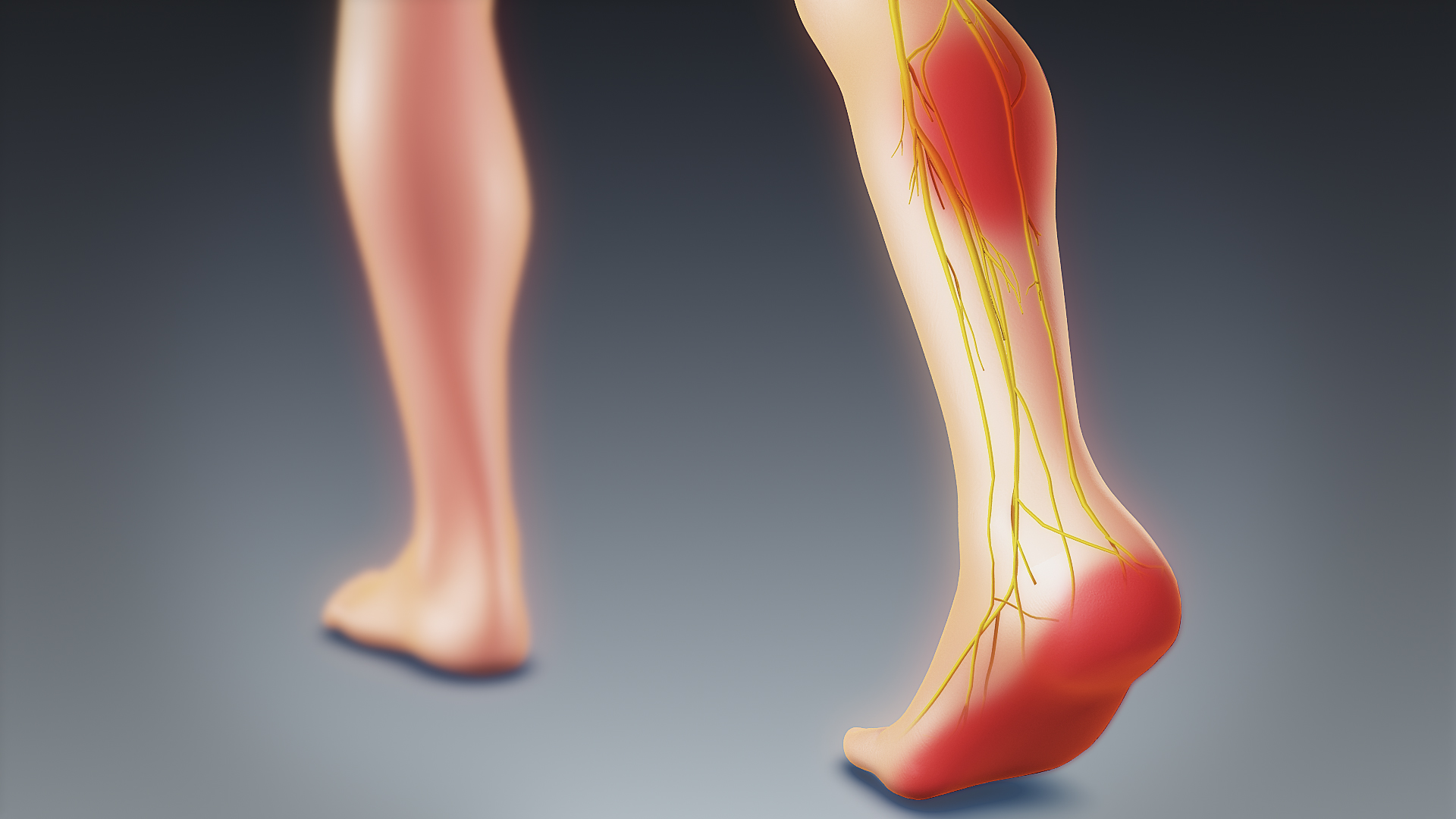
Sciatica often results in pain radiating down the leg.

The term "sciatica" usually describes a symptom—pain along the sciatic nerve pathway—rather than a specific condition, illness, or disease. Some use it to mean any pain starting in the lower back and going down the leg. The pain is characteristically described as shooting or shock-like, quickly traveling along the course of the affected nerves. Others use the term as a diagnosis (i.e. an indication of cause and effect) for nerve dysfunction caused by compression of one or more lumbar or sacral nerve roots from a spinal disc herniation. Pain typically occurs in the distribution of a dermatome and goes below the knee to the foot. It may be associated with neurological dysfunction, such as weakness and numbness.

== Causes ==
=== Risk factors ===
Modifiable risk factors for sciatica include smoking, obesity, occupation, and physical sports where back muscles and heavy weights are involved. Non-modifiable risk factors include increasing age, being male, and having a personal history of low back pain.

=== Spinal disc herniation ===
Spinal disc herniation pressing on one of the lumbar or sacral nerve roots is the most frequent cause of sciatica, being present in about 90% of cases. This is particularly true in those under age 50. Disc herniation most often occurs during heavy lifting. Pain typically increases when bending forward or sitting, and reduces when lying down or walking.

=== Spinal stenosis ===
Other compressive spinal causes include lumbar spinal stenosis, a condition in which the spinal canal, the space the spinal cord runs through, narrows and compresses the spinal cord, cauda equina, or sciatic nerve roots. This narrowing can be caused by bone spurs, spondylolisthesis, inflammation, or a herniated disc, which decreases available space for the spinal cord, thus pinching and irritating nerves from the spinal cord that become the sciatic nerve. This is the most frequent cause after age 50. Sciatic pain due to spinal stenosis is most commonly brought on by standing, walking, or sitting for extended periods of time, and reduces when bending forward. However, pain can arise with any position or activity in severe cases. The pain is most commonly relieved by rest.

=== Piriformis syndrome ===
Piriformis syndrome is a condition that, depending on the analysis, varies from a "very rare" cause to contributing up to 8% of low back or buttock pain. In 17% of people, the sciatic nerve runs through the piriformis muscle rather than beneath it. When the piriformis shortens or spasms due to trauma or overuse, it is posited that this causes compression of the sciatic nerve. Piriformis syndrome has colloquially been referred to as "wallet sciatica" since a wallet carried in a rear hip pocket compresses the buttock muscles and sciatic nerve when the bearer sits down. Piriformis syndrome may be suspected as a cause of sciatica when the spinal nerve roots contributing to the sciatic nerve are normal and no herniation of a spinal disc is apparent.

=== Deep gluteal syndrome ===
Deep gluteal syndrome is non-discogenic, extrapelvic sciatic nerve entrapment in the deep gluteal space. Piriformis syndrome was once the traditional model of sciatic nerve entrapment in this anatomic region. The understanding of non-discogenic sciatic nerve entrapment has changed significantly with improved knowledge of posterior hip anatomy, nerve kinematics, and advances in endoscopic techniques to explore the sciatic nerve. There are now many known causes of sciatic nerve entrapment, such as fibrous bands restricting nerve mobility, that are unrelated to the piriformis in the deep gluteal space. Deep gluteal syndrome was created as an improved classification for the many distinct causes of sciatic nerve entrapment in this anatomic region. Piriformis syndrome is now considered one of many causes of deep gluteal syndrome.

=== Endometriosis ===
Sciatic endometriosis, also called catamenial or cyclical sciatica, is a sciatica whose cause is endometriosis. Its incidence is unknown. Diagnosis is usually made by an MRI or CT-myelography.

=== Pregnancy ===
Sciatica may also occur during pregnancy, particularly in the later stages, as a result of the weight of the fetus pressing on the sciatic nerve during sitting or during leg spasms. While most cases do not directly harm the woman or the fetus, indirect harm may come from the numbing effect on the legs, which can cause loss of balance and falls. There is no standard treatment for pregnancy-induced sciatica.

=== Other ===
Pain that does not improve when lying down suggests a nonmechanical cause, such as cancer, inflammation, or infection. Sciatica can be caused by tumors impinging on the spinal cord or the nerve roots. Severe back pain extending to the hips and feet, loss of bladder or bowel control, or muscle weakness may result from spinal tumors or cauda equina syndrome. Trauma to the spine, such as from a car accident or hard fall onto the heel or buttocks, may also lead to sciatica. A relationship has been proposed with a latent Cutibacterium acnes infection in the intervertebral discs, but the role it plays is not yet clear.

== Pathophysiology ==
The sciatic nerve comprises nerve roots L4, L5, S1, S2, and S3 in the spine. These nerve roots merge in the pelvic cavity to form the sacral plexus and the sciatic nerve branches from that. Sciatica symptoms can occur when there is pathology anywhere along the course of these nerves.

=== Intraspinal sciatica ===
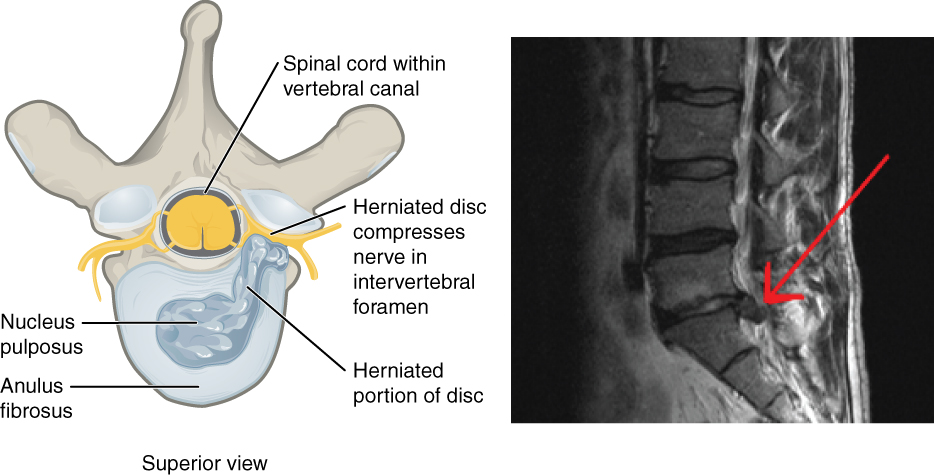
Left: Illustration of herniated spinal disc, superior view. Right: MRI showing herniated L5-S1 disc (red arrow tip), sagittal view.

Intraspinal, or discogenic sciatica refers to sciatica whose pathology involves the spine. In 90% of sciatica cases, this can occur as a result of a spinal disc bulge or herniation. Sciatica is generally caused by the compression of lumbar nerves L4 or L5 or sacral nerve S1. Less commonly, sacral nerves S2 or S3 may cause sciatica.

Intervertebral spinal discs consist of an outer anulus fibrosus and an inner nucleus pulposus. The anulus fibrosus forms a rigid ring around the nucleus pulposus early in human development, and the gelatinous contents of the nucleus pulposus are thus contained within the disc. Discs separate the spinal vertebrae, thereby increasing spinal stability and allowing nerve roots to properly exit through the spaces between the vertebrae from the spinal cord. As an individual ages, the anulus fibrosus weakens and becomes less rigid, making it at greater risk for tear. When there is a tear in the anulus fibrosus, the nucleus pulposus may extrude through the tear and press against spinal nerves within the spinal cord, cauda equina, or exiting nerve roots, causing inflammation, numbness, or excruciating pain. Inflammation of spinal tissue can then spread to adjacent facet joints and cause facet syndrome, which is characterized by lower back pain and referred pain in the posterior thigh.

Other causes of sciatica secondary to spinal nerve entrapment include the roughening, enlarging, or misalignment (spondylolisthesis) of vertebrae, or disc degeneration that reduces the diameter of the lateral foramen through which nerve roots exit the spine. When sciatica is caused by compression of a dorsal nerve root, it is considered a lumbar radiculopathy or radiculitis when accompanied by an inflammatory response.

=== Extraspinal sciatica ===
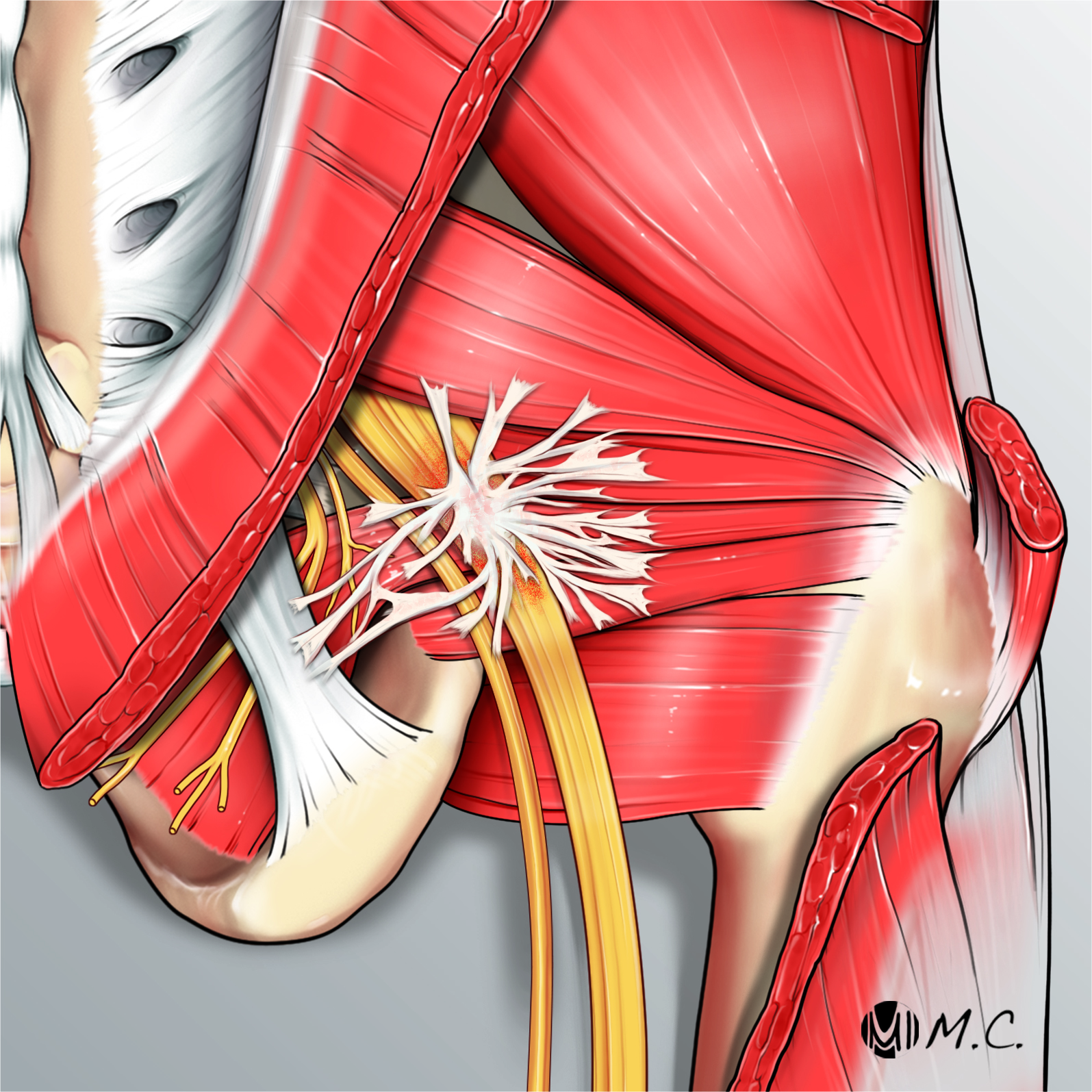
Illustration of fibrovascular bands restricting mobility of the sciatic nerve in multiple directions, like a splattering of glue

The sciatic nerve is highly mobile during hip and leg movements. Any pathology which restricts normal movement of the sciatic nerve can put abnormal pressure, strain, or tension on the nerve in certain positions or during normal movements. For example, the presence of scar tissue around a nerve can cause traction neuropathy.

A well known muscular cause of extraspinal sciatica is piriformis syndrome. The piriformis muscle is directly adjacent to the course of the sciatic nerve as it traverses through the intrapelvic space. Pathologies of the piriformis muscle such as injury (e.g. swelling and scarring), inflammation (release of cytokines affecting the local cellular environment), or space occupying lesions (e.g. tumor, cyst, hypertrophy) can affect the sciatic nerve. Anatomic variations in nerve branching can also predispose the sciatic nerve to further compression by the piriformis muscle, such as if the sciatic nerve pierces the piriformis muscle.

The sciatic nerve can also be entrapped outside of the pelvic space and this is called deep gluteal syndrome. Surgical research has identified new causes of entrapment such as fibrovascular scar bands, vascular abnormalities, heterotropic ossification, gluteal muscles, hamstring muscles, and the gemelli-obturator internus complex. In almost half of the endoscopic surgery cases, fibrovascular scar bands were found to be the cause of entrapment, impeding the movement of the sciatic nerve.

== Diagnosis ==
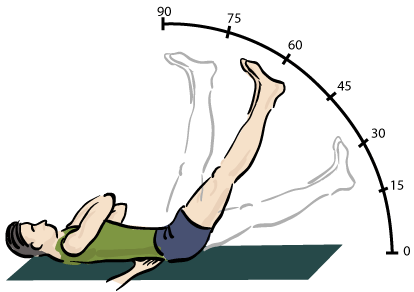
Straight leg test sometimes used to help diagnose a lumbar herniated disc

Sciatica is typically diagnosed by physical examination, and the history of the symptoms.

=== Physical tests ===
Generally, if a person reports the typical radiating pain in one leg, as well as one or more neurological indications of nerve root tension or neurological deficit, sciatica can be diagnosed.

The most frequently used diagnostic test is the straight leg raise to produce Lasègue's sign, which is considered positive if pain in the distribution of the sciatic nerve is reproduced with passive flexion of the straight leg between 30 and 70 degrees. While this test is positive in about 90% of people with sciatica, approximately 75% of people with a positive test do not have sciatica. Straight leg raising of the leg unaffected by sciatica may produce sciatica in the leg on the affected side; this is known as the Fajersztajn sign. The presence of the Fajersztajn sign is a more specific finding for a herniated disc than Lasègue's sign. Maneuvers that increase intraspinal pressure, such as coughing, flexion of the neck, and bilateral compression of the jugular veins, may transiently worsen sciatica pain.

=== Medical imaging ===
Imaging modalities such as computerised tomography or magnetic resonance imaging can help with the diagnosis of lumbar disc herniation. Both are equally effective at diagnosing lumbar disk herniation, but computerized tomography has a higher radiation dose. Radiography is not recommended because disks cannot be visualized by X-rays. The utility of MR neurography in the diagnosis of piriformis syndrome is controversial.

Discography could be considered to determine a specific disc's role in an individual's pain. Discography involves the insertion of a needle into a disc to determine the pressure of disc space. Radiocontrast is then injected into the disc space to assess for visual changes that may indicate an anatomic abnormality of the disc. The reproduction of an individual's pain during discography is also diagnostic.

=== Differential diagnosis ===
Cancer should be suspected if there is previous history of it, unexplained weight loss, or unremitting pain. Spinal epidural abscess is more common among those who have diabetes mellitus or immunodeficiency, or who have had spinal surgery, injection or catheter; it typically causes fever, leukocytosis and increased erythrocyte sedimentation rate. If cancer or spinal epidural abscess is suspected, urgent magnetic resonance imaging is recommended for confirmation. Proximal diabetic neuropathy typically affects middle aged and older people with well-controlled type-2 diabetes mellitus; onset is sudden, causing pain, usually in multiple dermatomes, quickly followed by weakness. Diagnosis typically involves electromyography and lumbar puncture. Shingles is more common among the elderly and immunocompromised; typically, pain is followed by the appearance of a rash with small blisters along a single dermatome. Acute Lyme radiculopathy may follow a history of outdoor activities during warmer months in likely tick habitats in the previous 1–12 weeks. In the U.S., Lyme is most common in New England and Mid-Atlantic states and parts of Wisconsin and Minnesota, but it is expanding to other areas. The first manifestation is usually an expanding rash possibly accompanied by flu-like symptoms. Lyme can also cause a milder, chronic radiculopathy an average of 8 months after the acute illness.

== Management ==
Sciatica can be managed with a number of different treatments with the goal of restoring a person's normal functional status and quality of life. When the cause of sciatica is lumbar disc herniation (90% of cases), most cases resolve spontaneously over weeks to months. Initially treatment in the first 6–8 weeks should be conservative. More than 75% of sciatica cases are managed without surgery. Smokers with sciatica are strongly urged to quit in order to promote healing. Treatment of the underlying cause of nerve compression is needed in cases of epidural abscess, epidural tumors, and cauda equina syndrome.

=== Physical activity ===
Physical activity is often recommended for the conservative management of sciatica for persons who are physically able. Bed rest is not recommended. Although structured exercises provide small, short-term benefit for leg pain, in the long term no difference is seen between exercise or simply staying active. The evidence for physical therapy in sciatica is unclear though such programs appear safe. Physical therapy is commonly used. Nerve mobilization techniques for sciatic nerve are supported by tentative evidence.

=== Medication ===
There is no one medication regimen used to treat sciatica. Evidence supporting the use of opioids and muscle relaxants is poor. Low-quality evidence indicates that NSAIDs do not appear to improve immediate pain, and all NSAIDs appear to be nearly equivalent in their ability to relieve sciatica. Nevertheless, NSAIDs are commonly recommended as a first-line treatment for sciatica. In those with sciatica due to piriformis syndrome, botulinum toxin injections may improve pain and function. While there is little evidence supporting the use of epidural or systemic steroids, systemic steroids may be offered to individuals with confirmed disc herniation if there is a contraindication to NSAID use. Low-quality evidence supports the use of gabapentin for acute pain relief in those with chronic sciatica. Anticonvulsants and biologics have not been shown to improve acute or chronic sciatica. Antidepressants have demonstrated some efficacy in treating chronic sciatica, and may be offered to individuals who are not amenable to NSAIDs or who have failed NSAID therapy.

=== Surgery ===
If sciatica is caused by a herniated disc, the disc's partial or complete removal, known as a discectomy, has tentative evidence of benefit in the short term. A modest reduction in pain is seen after 26 weeks, but not after one year (about 52 weeks). If the cause is spondylolisthesis or spinal stenosis, surgery appears to provide pain relief for up to two years.

For non-discogenic sciatica, the surgical treatment is typically a nerve decompression. A decompression seeks to remove tissue around the nerve that may be compressing it or restricting movement of the nerve.

=== Alternative medicine ===
Low to moderate-quality evidence suggests that spinal manipulation is an effective treatment for acute sciatica. For chronic sciatica, the evidence supporting spinal manipulation as treatment is poor. Spinal manipulation has been found generally safe for the treatment of disc-related pain; however, case reports have found an association with cauda equina syndrome, and it is contraindicated when there are progressive neurological deficits.

== Prognosis ==
About 39% to 50% of people with sciatica still have symptoms after one to four years. In one study, around 20% were unable to work at their one-year followup, and 10% had surgery for the condition.

== Epidemiology ==
Depending on how it is defined, less than 1% to 40% of people have sciatica at some point in time. Sciatica is most common between the ages of 40 and 59, and men are more frequently affected than women.

== See also ==
- Failed back syndrome
- Low back pain
- Lumbar spinal stenosis
- Nerve compression syndrome
- Neuropathic pain
- Paresthesia
- Piriformis syndrome
- Sciatic nerve
- Spinal disk herniation
- Spondylolisthesis
