= Gluteal nerve =

Gluteal nerve may refer to:

- Superior gluteal nerve
- Inferior gluteal nerve
