= Magnetic resonance neurography =

MRI technique to image nerves

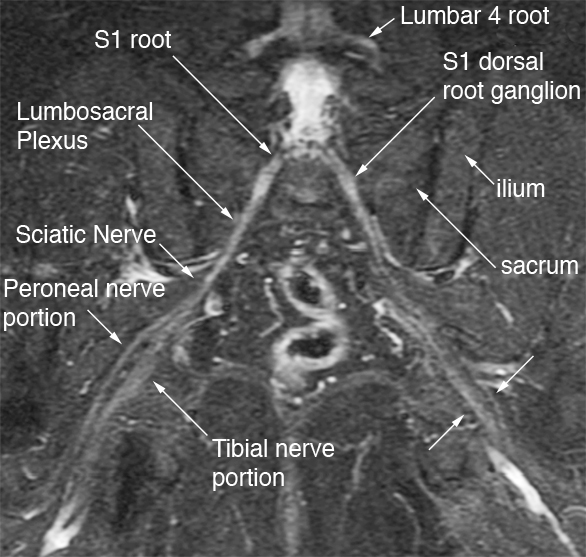
Bilateral split sciatic nerve

Magnetic resonance neurography (MRN) is the direct imaging of nerves in the body by optimizing selectivity for unique MRI water properties of nerves. It is a modification of magnetic resonance imaging. This technique yields a detailed image of a nerve from the resonance signal that arises from in the nerve itself rather than from surrounding tissues or from fat in the nerve lining. Because of the intraneural source of the image signal, the image provides a medically useful set of information about the internal state of the nerve such as the presence of irritation, nerve swelling (edema), compression, pinch or injury. Standard magnetic resonance images can show the outline of some nerves in portions of their courses but do not show the intrinsic signal from nerve water. Magnetic resonance neurography is used to evaluate major nerve compressions such as those affecting the sciatic nerve (e.g. piriformis syndrome), the brachial plexus nerves (e.g. thoracic outlet syndrome), the pudendal nerve, or virtually any named nerve in the body. A related technique for imaging neural tracts in the brain and spinal cord is called magnetic resonance tractography or diffusion tensor imaging.

== History and physical basis ==
Magnetic resonance imaging (MRI) is based on differences in the physical properties of protons in water molecules in different tissues in the body. The protons and the water molecules of which they are part have subtly different movement characteristics that relate to their biophysical surroundings. Because of this, MRI is capable of differentiating one tissue from another; this provides "tissue contrast." From the time of the first clinical use of MRI in the mid-1970s until 1992, however, despite the active work of many thousands of researchers, there was no reliable method for visualizing nerve. In some parts of the body, nerves could be observed as areas of absent signal delineated by bright fat, or as bland grey structures that could not be reliably distinguished from other similar-appearing structures in cross sectional images.

In 1992, Aaron Filler and Franklyn Howe, working at St. George's Hospital Medical School in London, succeeded in identifying the unique water properties of nerve water that would make it possible to generate tissue-specific nerve images. The result was an initial "pure" nerve image in which every other tissue was made to disappear leaving behind only the image of the nerves. The initial pure nerve image served as the basis of image processing techniques leading to discovery of a series of other MRI pulse sequence techniques that would make nerves imageable as well. Further, because they demonstrate water signal arising in the neural tissue itself, they can also reveal abnormalities that affect only the nerve and that do not affect surrounding tissues. More than three million patients seek medical attention every year for nerve-related disorders such as sciatica, carpal tunnel syndrome or various other nerve injuries, yet before 1992, no radiologists were trained to image nerves.

There are two main physical bases for the imaging discovery. Firstly, it was known at the time that water diffused preferentially along the long axis of neural tissue in the brain – a property called "anisotropic diffusion". Diffusion MRI had been developed to take advantage of this phenomenon to show contrast between white matter and grey matter in the brain. However, diffusion MRI proved ineffective for imaging of nerves for reasons that were not initially clear. Filler and Howe discovered that the problem was that most of the image signal in nerves came from protons that were not involved in anisotropic diffusion. They developed a collection of methods to suppress the "isotropic signal" and this resulted in allowing the anisotropic signal to be unmasked. This was based on the discovery that Chemical Shift Selection could be used to suppress "short T2 water" in the nerve and that this mostly affected isotropic water.

The endoneurial fluid compartment in nerve can be unmasked by similar techniques resulting in a "T2" based neurography as well as the original diffusion based neurography technique. Endoneurial fluid increases when nerve is compressed, irritated or injured, leading to nerve image hyperintensity in a magnetic resonance neurography image. Subsequent research has further demonstrated the biophysical basis for the ability of MR Neurography to show nerve injury and irritation.

Measurements of the T2 relaxation rate of nerve by Filler and Howe revealed that previous reports of a short relaxation time were wrong and that—once signal from lipid protons was suppressed—the primary image signal from nerve had long T2 relaxation rates best imaged with pulse sequence echo times in the range of 50 to 100 milliseconds. In addition, they later showed that T2-neurography differs from most other MR imaging in that the conspicuity or relative prominence of nerve is affected by the angle of voxel orientation during the acquisition of the image. When acquisitions are done with echo times below 40 milliseconds, there can be "magic angle effects" that provide some spurious information, so MR Neurography is always done with echo times greater than 40 milliseconds. The need for long echo times also characterizes the type of inversion recovery fat suppression sequences used for neurography nerve imaging.

Within a few months of the initial findings on diffusion-based nerve imaging, the diffusion technique for nerve imaging was adapted to permit for visualization of neural tracts in the spinal cord and brain via Diffusion Tensor Imaging.

== Clinical uses ==
The most significant impact of magnetic resonance neurography is on the evaluation of the large proximal nerve elements such as the brachial plexus (the nerves between the cervical spine and the underarm that innervate shoulder, arm and hand), the lumbosacral plexus (nerves between the lumbosacral spine and legs), the sciatic nerve in the pelvis, as well as other nerves such as the pudendal nerve that follow deep or complex courses.

Neurography has also been helpful for improving image diagnosis in spine disorders. It can help identify which spinal nerve is actually irritated as a supplement to routine spinal MRI. Standard spinal MRI only demonstrates the anatomy and numerous disk bulges, bone spurs or stenoses that may or may not actually cause nerve impingement symptoms.

Many nerves, such as the median and ulnar nerve in the arm or the tibial nerve in the tarsal tunnel, are just below the skin surface and can be tested for pathology with electromyography, but this technique has always been difficult to apply for deep proximal nerves. Magnetic resonance neurography has greatly expanded the efficacy of nerve diagnosis by allowing uniform evaluation of virtually any nerve in the body.

There are numerous reports dealing with specialized uses of magnetic resonance neurography for nerve pathology such as traumatic brachial plexus root avulsions, cervical radiculopathy, guidance for nerve blocks, demonstration of cysts in nerves, carpal tunnel syndrome, and obstetrical brachial plexus palsy. In addition several formal large scale outcome trials carried out with high quality "Class A" methodology have been published that have verified the clinical efficacy and validity of MR Neurography.

Use of magnetic resonance neurography is increasing in neurology and neurosurgery as the implications of its value in diagnosing various causes of sciatica becomes more widespread. There are 1.5 million lumbar MRI scans performed in the US each year for sciatica, leading to surgery for a herniated disk in about 300,000 patients per year. Of these, about 100,000 surgeries fail. Therefore, there is successful treatment for sciatica in just 200,000 and failure of diagnosis or treatment in up to 1.3 million annually in the US alone. The success rate of the paradigm of lumbar MRI and disk resection for treatment of sciatica is therefore about 15%(Filler 2005). Neurography has been applied increasingly to evaluate the distal nerve roots, lumbo-sacral plexus and proximal sciatic nerve in the pelvis and thigh to find other causes of sciatica. It is increasingly important for brachial plexus imaging and for the diagnosis of thoracic outlet syndrome. Research and development in the clinical use of diagnostic neurography has taken place at Johns Hopkins, the Mayo Clinic, UCLA, UCSF, Harvard, the University of Washington in Seattle, University of London, and Oxford University (see references below) as well as through the Neurography Institute. Recent patent litigation concerning MR Neurography has led some unlicensed centers to discontinue offering the technique. Courses have been offered for radiologists at the annual meetings of the Radiological Society of North America (RSNA), and at the International Society for Magnetic Resonance in Medicine and for surgeons at the annual meetings of the American Association of Neurological Surgeons and the Congress of Neurological Surgeons. The use of imaging for diagnosis of nerve disorders represents a change from the way most physicians were trained to practice over the past several decades, as older routine tests fail to identify the diagnosis for nerve related disorders. The New England Journal of Medicine in July 2009 published a report on whole body neurography using a diffusion based neurography technique. In 2010, RadioGraphics - a publication of the Radiological Society of North America that serves to provide continuing medical education to radiologists - published an article series taking the position that Neurography has an important role in the evaluation of entrapment neuropathies.

Magnetic resonance neurography does not pose any diagnostic disadvantage relative to standard magnetic resonance imaging because neurography studies typically include high resolution standard MRI image series for anatomical reference along with the neurographic sequences. However, the patient will generally have a slightly longer time in the scanner compared to a routine MRI scan. Magnetic resonance neurography can only be performed in 1.5 tesla and 3 tesla cylindrical type scanners and can't really be done effectively in lower power "open" MR scanners - this can pose significant challenges for claustrophobic patients. Although it has been in use for fifteen years and is the subject of more than 150 research publications, most insurance companies still classify this test as experimental and may decline reimbursement, resulting in the need to file appeals. Patients in some plans obtain standard insurance coverage for this widely used procedure.
