= Sciatic nerve =

Large nerve in humans and other animals

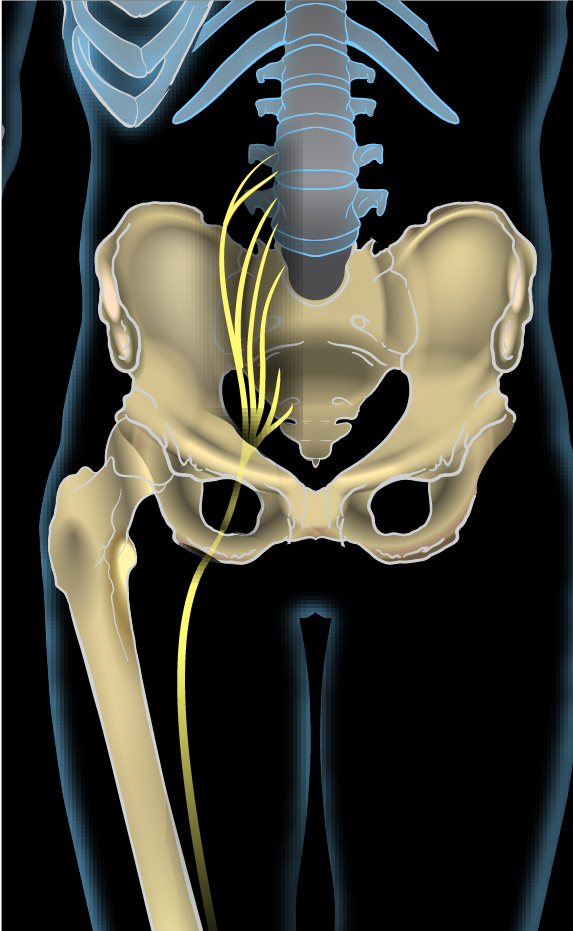
- Right gluteal region, showing the formation of the sciatic nerve

Details
- Pronunciation: /saɪˈætɪk/
- From: Lumbar and sacral plexus (L4-S3)
- To: Tibial and common fibular nerve
- Innervates: Lateral rotator group (except piriformis and quadratus femoris) and the posterior compartment of thigh

Identifiers
- Latin: nervus ischiadicus
- MeSH: D012584
- TA98: A14.2.07.046
- TA2: 6569
- FMA: 19034

The sciatic nerve, also called the ischiadic nerve, is a large nerve in humans and other vertebrate animals. It is the largest branch of the sacral plexus and runs alongside the hip joint and down the lower limb. It is the longest and widest single nerve in the human body, going from the top of the leg to the foot on the posterior aspect. The sciatic nerve has no cutaneous branches for the thigh. This nerve provides the connection to the nervous system for the skin of the lateral leg and the whole foot, the muscles of the back of the thigh, and those of the leg and foot. It is derived from spinal nerves L4 to S3. It contains fibres from both the anterior and posterior divisions of the lumbosacral plexus.

== Structure ==
In humans, the sciatic nerve is formed from the L4 to S3 segments of the sacral plexus, a collection of nerve fibres that emerge from the sacral part of the spinal cord. The lumbosacral trunk from the L4 and L5 roots descends between the sacral promontory and ala, and the S1 to S3 roots emerge from the ventral sacral foramina. These nerve roots unite to form a single nerve in front of the piriformis muscle. The nerve passes beneath the piriformis and through the greater sciatic foramen, exiting the pelvis. From here, it travels down the posterior thigh to the popliteal fossa. The nerve travels in the posterior compartment of the thigh behind (superficial to) the adductor magnus muscle and is itself in front of (deep to) the long head of the biceps femoris muscle. At the popliteal fossa, the nerve divides into its two branches:

- The tibial nerve, which travels down the posterior compartment of the leg into the foot
- The common fibular nerve (also called the common peroneal nerve), which travels down the anterior and lateral compartments of the leg into the foot

The sciatic nerve is the largest nerve in the human body.

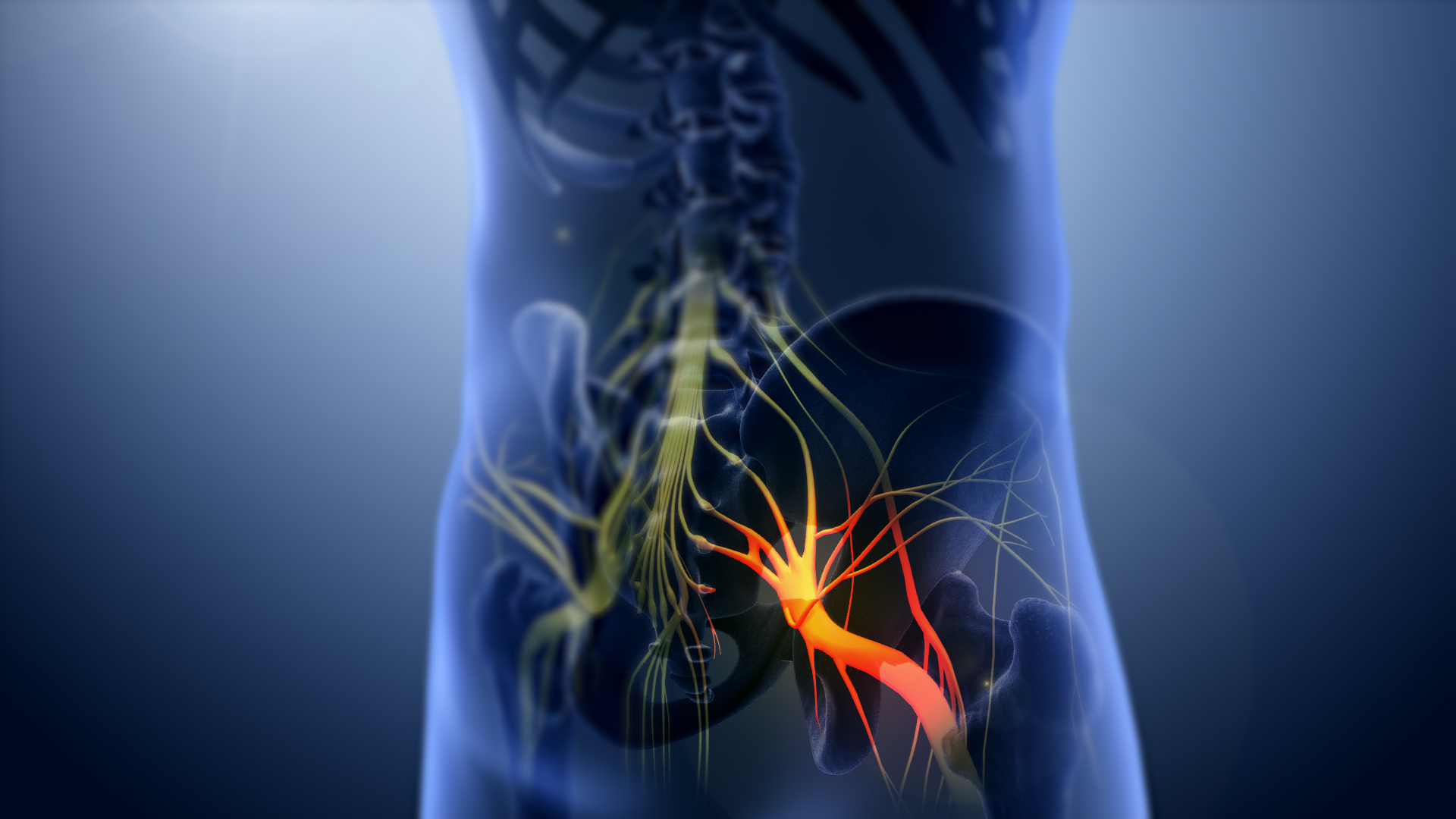
3D still showing Sciatica.

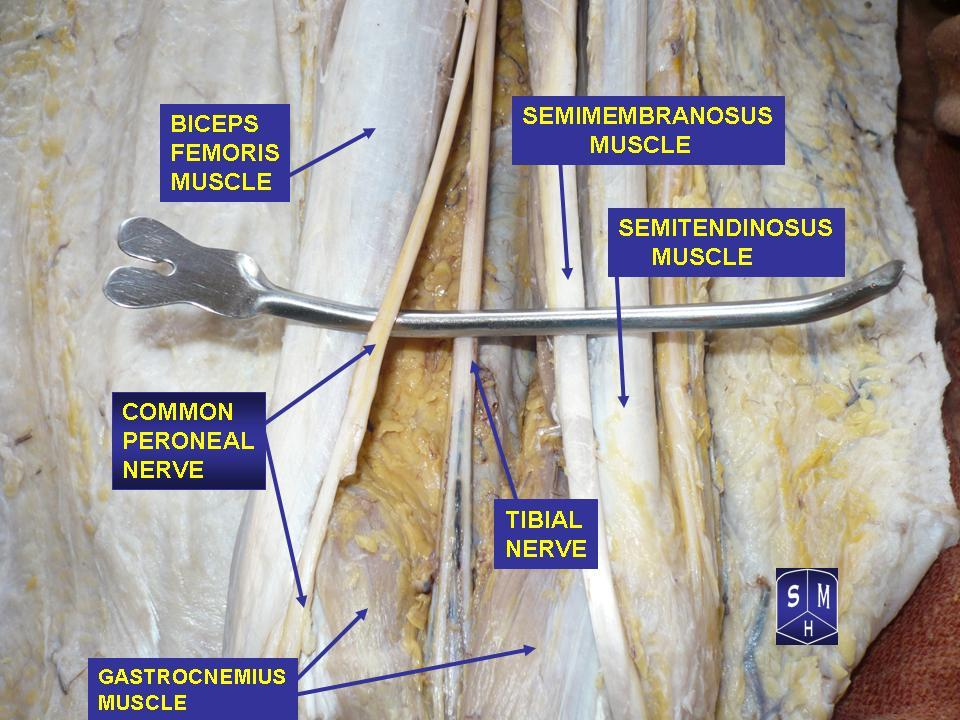
Tibial and common fibular nerve (aka common peroneal nerve)

== Function ==
The sciatic nerve supplies sensation to the skin of the foot, as well as the entire lower leg (except for its inner side). Sensation to skin to the sole of the foot is provided by the tibial nerve, and the lower leg and upper surface of the foot via the common fibular nerve.

The sciatic nerve also innervates muscles. In particular:

- Via the tibial nerve, the muscles in the posterior compartment of the leg and sole of the foot (plantar aspect). (Note: Namely the flexor hallicus longus, flexor digitorum longus, tibialis posterior and popliteus of the deep part of the compartment, and the gastrocnemius, soleus and plantaris of the superficial part of the compartment.)
- Via the common fibular nerve, the muscles in the anterior and lateral compartments of the leg. (Note: Namely the tibialis anterior, extensor hallucis longus, extensor digitorum longus, and fibularis tertius (peroneus tertius) of the anterior compartment, and the Fibularis longus and brevis of the lateral compartment.)

== Clinical significance ==
=== Sciatica ===
Pain caused by compression or irritation of the sciatic nerve by a problem in the lumbar region is called sciatica. Common causes of sciatica include the following lower back and hip conditions: spinal disc herniation, degenerative disc disease, lumbar spinal stenosis, spondylolisthesis, and piriformis syndrome. Other acute causes of sciatica include coughing, muscular hypertension, and sneezing.

=== Injury ===
A sciatic nerve injury occurs between 0.5% and 2.0% of the time during a hip replacement. Sciatic nerve palsy is a complication of total hip arthroplasty with an incidence of 0.2% to 2.8% of the time, or with an incidence of 1.7% to 7.6% following revision. Following the procedure, in rare cases, a screw, broken piece of trochanteric wire, fragment of methyl methacrylate bone cement, or Burch-Schneider antiprofusio cage can impinge on the nerve; this can cause sciatic nerve palsy, which may resolve after the fragment is removed and the nerve is freed. The nerve can be surrounded by oxidised, regenerated cellulose to prevent further scarring. Sciatic nerve palsy can also result from severe spinal stenosis following the procedure, which can be addressed by spinal decompression surgery. It is unclear if inversion therapy is able to decompress the sacral vertebrae; it may only work on the lumbar aspects of the sciatic nerves.

A sciatic nerve injury may also occur from improperly performed injections into the buttock, and may result in sensory loss.

=== Other disease ===
Bernese periacetabular osteotomy resulted in major nerve deficits in the sciatic or femoral nerves in 2.1% of 1760 patients, of whom approximately half experienced complete recovery within a mean of 5.5 months.

Sciatic nerve exploration can be done by endoscopy in a minimally invasive procedure to assess lesions of the nerve. Endoscopic treatment for sciatic nerve entrapment has been investigated in deep gluteal syndrome. Patients were treated with sciatic nerve decompression by resection of fibrovascular scar bands, piriformis tendon release, obturator internus, or quadratus femoris, or by hamstring tendon scarring.

=== Anaesthetic ===
Signals from the sciatic nerve and its branches can be blocked, in order to interrupt the transmission of pain signals from the innervation area, by performing a regional nerve blockade called a sciatic nerve block.

== Society and culture ==
According to Jewish law, the sciatic nerve (Hebrew: Gid hanasheh) may not be eaten by Jews to commemorate Jacob's injury in his struggle with an angel.

== Additional images ==
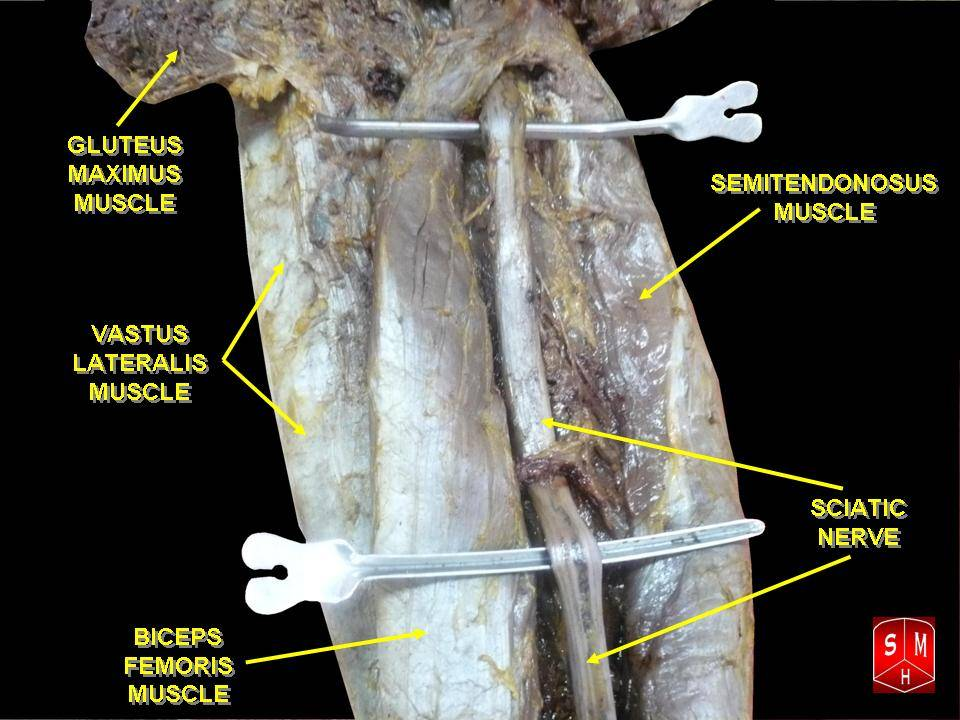
Sciatic nerve.

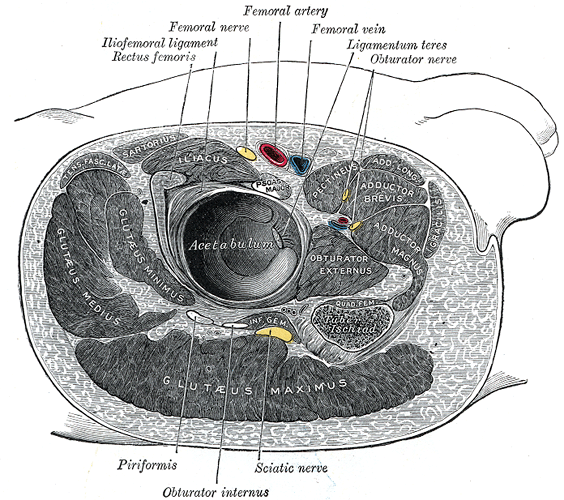
Structures surrounding left hip-joint.

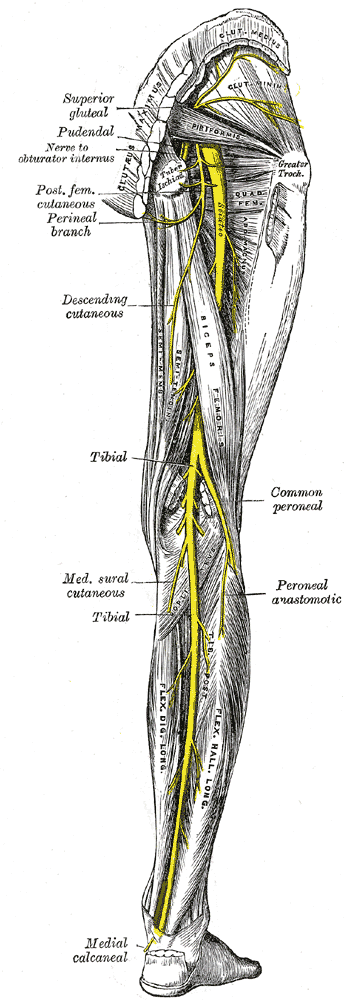
Nerves of the right lower extremity. Posterior view.

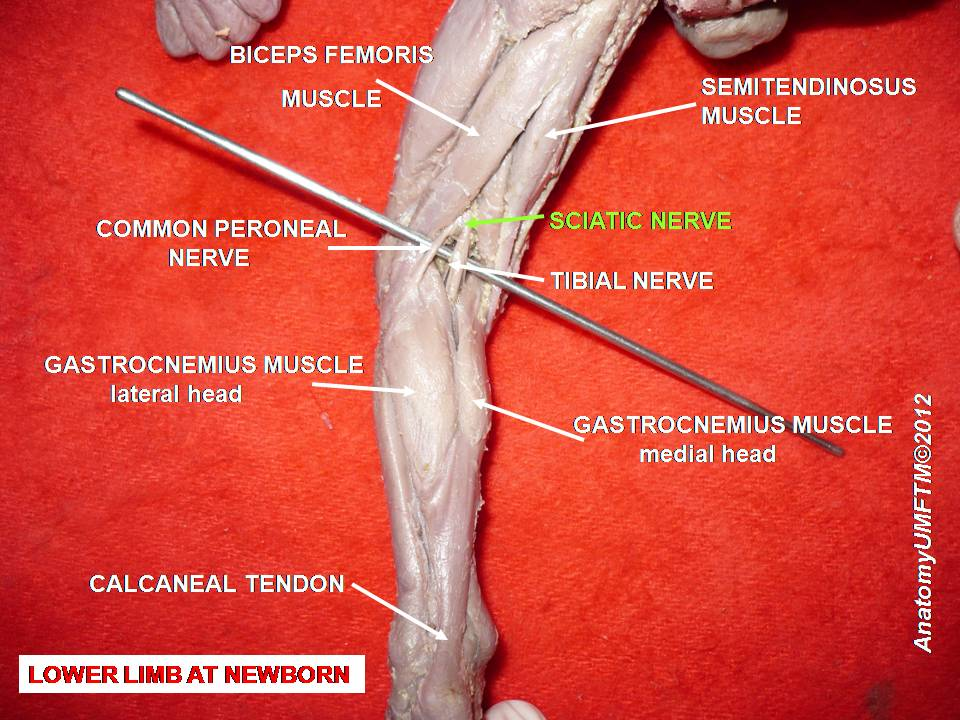
Sciatic nerve.

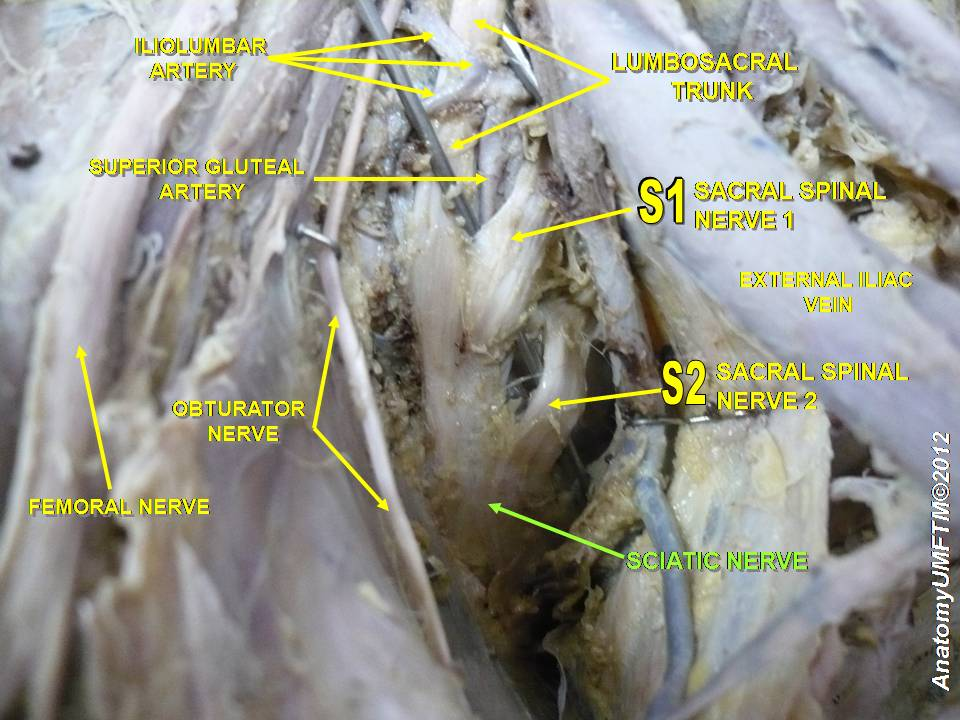
Sciatic nerve.

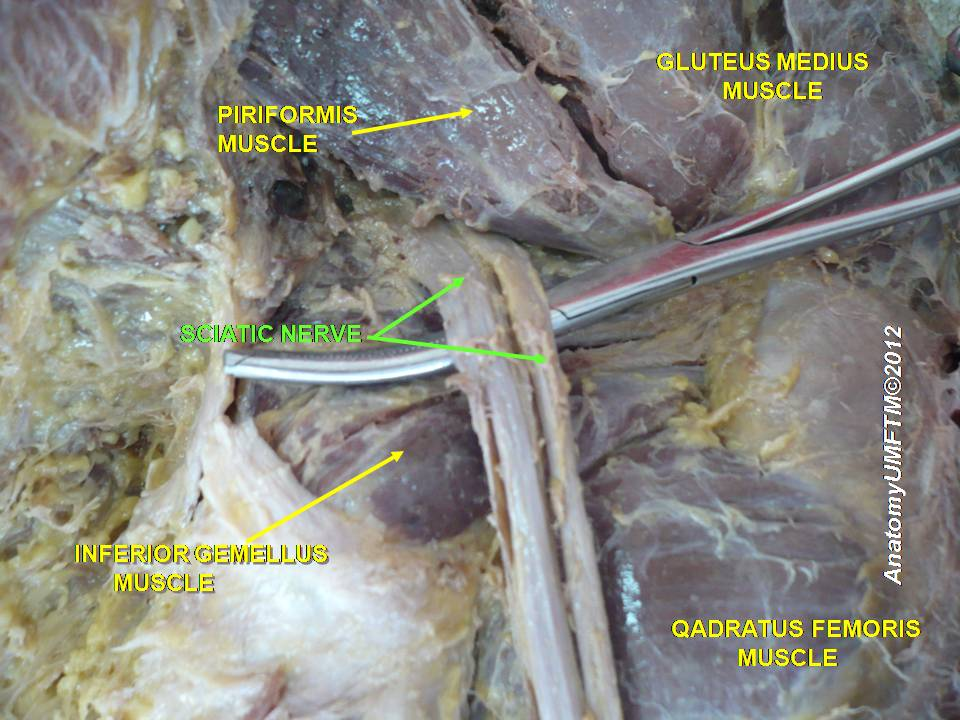
Sciatic nerve.

== See also ==
- Lesser sciatic notch
- Greater sciatic notch
- Lumbosacral plexus
- Sacral plexus
- Tibial nerve
- Common peroneal nerve
- Peripheral nervous system
- Sciatica
- Spinal disc herniation
- Piriformis syndrome
- Deep gluteal syndrome
