= Straight leg raise =

Body movement and diagnostic test

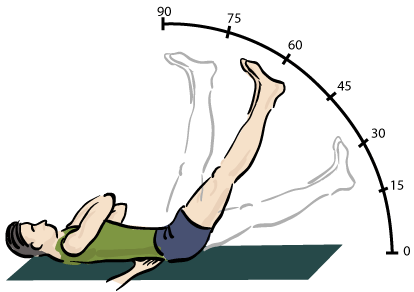
- Straight leg test sometimes used to help diagnose a lumbar herniated disc. Usually the legs are raised alternatingly, not simultaneously.
- Purpose: determine if a herniated disc is the cause of leg pain

The straight leg raise is a test that can be performed during a physical examination, with the leg being lifted actively by the patient or passively by the clinician. If the straight leg raise is done actively by the patient, it is a test of functional leg strength, particularly the rectus femoris element of the quadriceps (checking both hip flexion and knee extension strength simultaneously). If carried out passively (also called Lasègue's sign, Lasègue test or Lazarević's sign), it is used to determine whether a patient with low back pain has an underlying nerve root sensitivity, often located at L5 (fifth lumbar spinal nerve). The rest of this article relates to the passive version of the test.

== Technique ==
With the patient lying down on their back on an examination table or exam floor, the examiner lifts the patient's leg while the knee is straight.

A variation is to lift the leg while the patient is sitting. However, this reduces the sensitivity of the test.

In order to make this test more specific, the ankle can be dorsiflexed and the cervical spine flexed. This increases the stretching of the nerve root and dura.

== Interpretation ==
If the patient experiences sciatic pain, and more specifically pain radiating down the leg (radiculopathy), when the straight leg is at an angle of between 30 and 70 degrees, then the test is positive and a herniated disk is a possible cause of the pain. A negative test suggests a likely different cause for back pain.

A positive straight leg test reproduces radiating leg pain. If it only causes back pain, then the test is negative.

A meta-analysis reported the straight-leg test as having:

- sensitivity 91%
- specificity 26%

If raising the opposite leg causes pain (cross or contralateral straight leg raising):

- sensitivity 29%
- specificity 88%

== Lasègue's sign ==
Lasègue's sign was named after Charles Lasègue (1816–1883). In 1864 Lasègue's medical student J.J. Forst described the signs of developing low back pain while straightening the knee when the leg has already been lifted. In 1880 Serbian doctor Laza Lazarević described the straight leg raise test as it is used today, so the sign is often named Lazarević's sign in Serbia and some other countries.

== See also ==
- Femoral nerve stretch test
