= Sensory neuronopathy =

Sensory neuropathy caused by damage of nerve cells in the dorsal root ganglion

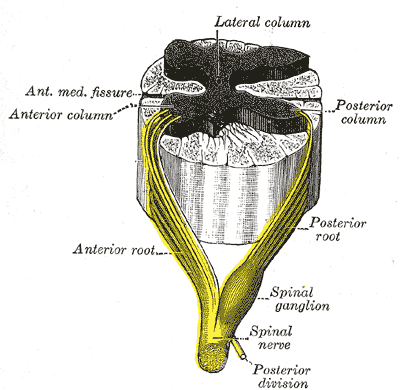
- Nerves in the dorsal root ganglion (also known as the spinal ganglion) are damaged in sensory neuronopathy/sensory ganglionopathy
- Specialty: Neurology
- Symptoms: Loss of sensation, pain, parasthesias, ataxia, dysesthesia
- Usual onset: Variable
- Duration: Lifetime
- Diagnostic method: Clinical diagnosis combined with nerve conduction studies, MRI, spinal fluid analysis
- Differential diagnosis: Other forms of peripheral neuropathy
- Treatment: Immunomodulators

Sensory neuronopathy (also known as sensory ganglionopathy) is a type of peripheral neuropathy that results primarily in sensory symptoms (such as parasthesias, pain or ataxia) due to destruction of nerve cell bodies in the dorsal root ganglion. The causes of nerve damage are grouped into categories including those due to paraneoplastic causes (neuropathy secondary to cancer), immune mediated, infectious, inherited or degenerative causes and those due to toxin exposure. In idiopathic sensory neuronopathy no cause is identified. Idiopathic causes account for about 50% of cases. Sensory neuronopathy differs from the more common length dependent axonal polyneuropathies (such as diabetic sensorimotor polyneuropathy) in that the symptoms do not progress in a distal to proximal pattern (starting in the feet and progressing to the legs and hands), rather symptoms develop in a multifocal, asymmetric, and non-length dependent manner (often involving all 4 limbs at onset). Ataxia (lack of coordination) is a prominent symptom early in the disease course. The trigeminal nerve ganglion is also commonly affected leading to facial numbness. Motor nerves are usually not affected however some cases do have mild motor involvement in the form of weakness. Symptoms tend to develop sub-acutely, over weeks, in acquired sensory neuronopathy and more slowly in inherited or primary degenerative cases. In cases of paraneoplastic or infectious sensory neuropathy, treatment is directed at the underlying cancer or infectious cause respectively. Immunomodulatory and anti-inflammatory therapies are also commonly used however their effectiveness is limited.

== Signs and symptoms ==
The dorsal root ganglion contains cell bodies for sensory nerves including large, myelinated Aβ fibers which carry proprioception and tactile touch sensation to the brain via the dorsal column–medial lemniscus pathway and small, unmyelinated C fibers which carry thermal and pain sensation to the brain via the spinothalamic tract. The destruction of nerve bodies in the dorsal root ganglia in sensory ganglionopathies thus leads to symptoms of ataxia, decreased sensation, pain, dysesthesia, paresthesias and allodynia that characteristically occurs in a multifocal, asymmetric distribution and in a non-length dependent manner. Symptoms usually start in the upper and lower extremities at onset and often also involve the face. This is in contrast to diabetic peripheral polyneuropathy and other length-dependent axonal polyneuropathies in which symptoms start in the feet and then progress proximally to affect the legs, hands, arms, thighs and trunk. Strength is usually normal, but sometimes can be mildly affected. The symptom onset in acquired sensory neuronopathy is subacute with symptoms developing over weeks, however idiopathic and inherited causes often follow a more chronic, indolent course with symptoms developing over years.

== Cause ==
Sensory neuronopathy is thought to be primarily a T-cell mediated inflammatory process that leads to destruction of nerve cell bodies in the dorsal root ganglion. The dorsal root ganglion is not separated by a blood brain barrier as it contains fenestrated capillaries which are highly permeable. This allows antibodies, T-cells, toxins and other substances to enter, causing damage to the nerve cell bodies. Paraneoplastic sensory neuropathy occurs in the setting of cancer and is thought to involve anti-cancer antibodies cross reacting with antigens that are expressed by neurons and cancer cells. The most common auto-antibodies are those of the T-cell mediated anti-Hu antibodies being taken up by nerve cells and attaching to ELAV-like protein 1 (ELAVL-1), ELAVL-2 and ELAVL-3 which are mRNA binding proteins. Small cell lung cancer is the most common anti-Hu antibody associated paraneoplastic syndrome associated sensory neuropathy. But other cancers which may cause paraneoplastic sensory neuropathy include bronchogenic carcinoma, breast cancer, ovarian cancer, Hodgkin lymphoma, prostate cancer, bladder cancer, neuroendocrine tumors, mixed Mullerian tumor and sarcomas. Symptoms of sensory neuropathy may sometimes precede the cancer diagnosis by several months.

Immune mediated sensory neuronopathy is commonly associated with Sjogrens syndrome. Sjogren's is most commonly affected by a length dependent axonal sensorimotor neuropathy characterized by symptoms in the extremities. However, people with Sjogren's may also develop a sensory neuronopathy with progressive numbness in the face, trunk, limbs in a non-length dependent manner. In Sjogren's sensory neuronopathy, vibratory and proprioceptive sensations are profoundly affected, leading to a severe ataxia. Sensory neuronopathy is thought to involve 40% of neuropathies in Sjogren's syndrome and 5% of all cases of Sjogren's overall, it is usually subacute in onset. Other immune mediated causes of sensory neuronopathy include systemic lupus erythematosus, autoimmune hepatitis and celiac disease.

Toxin exposure can also lead to sensory neuronopathies. Platinum-based antineoplastic chemotherapeutic agents are particularly toxic to the dorsal root ganglion. And long term vitamin B6 toxicity has also been implicated, with severe ataxia due to large fiber proprioceptive involvement. Vitamin B6 is thought to lead to neuropathy due to its cytoskeletal and microtubule toxicity leading to nerve cell loss with prolonged overdosing.

Possible infectious causes of sensory neuronopathy include HIV (in which lymphocyte infiltrates have been observed in the dorsal root ganglion), Human T-lymphotropic virus 1, Epstein-Barr virus and varicella zoster virus.

Several inherited neurodegenerative disease have also been shown to have dorsal root ganglion destruction leading to sensory ganglionopathy (in addition to other central and peripheral nervous system aberrations). These include Friedrich ataxia, Cerebellar ataxia, neuropathy, vestibular areflexia syndrome (CANVAS), and Facial onset sensory and motor neuronopathy (FOSMN).

== Diagnosis ==
Sensory neuronopathy is diagnosed clinically, based on signs and symptoms, along with nerve conduction studies. Ataxia in the upper and lower extremities at onset or at full development, asymmetric distribution of sensory loss, sensory loss not being restricted to the lower limbs (as in length dependent axonal polyneuropathy) are specific to sensory neuronopathies. Nerve conduction studies will show absent or reduced sensory nerve conduction action potentials in the upper and lower limbs with preserved conduction velocity. Motor nerve action potentials and conduction are usually unaffected (as motor function is usually preserved in sensory neuronopathies), but in a subset of cases may have limited dysfunction. Analysis of the cerebrospinal fluid may show increased protein, pleocytosis and oligoclonal bands but this is non-specific. Biopsy of the dorsal nerve root ganglions show a characteristic CD8+ T-cell inflammation pattern, but this is not required for diagnosis and is technically difficult to complete, only sometimes being done on autopsy. A skin biopsy may show decreased density of nerve fibers, but this is rarely needed for the diagnosis. MRI may show T2 enhancement and swelling of the dorsal root ganglia, as well as degeneration of the posterior columns of the spinal cord.

== Treatment ==
Treatment in sensory neuronopathy is usually ineffective. Immunomodulation has been used in with varying levels of success. This includes steroids, immunoglobulin therapy, plasma exchange, cyclophosphamide, rituximab and sirolimus. Immunomodulatory treatments are more efficacious if started early in the disease process (within 2 months of symptom onset). Treating the underlying cancer in paraneoplastic disease usually does not alleviate the symptoms.

Tricyclic antidepressants such as amitriptyline, Serotonin–norepinephrine reuptake inhibitors such as duloxetine or venlafaxine and gabapentinoids such as gabapentin or pregabalin may be used for the symptomatic treatment of pain including dysesthesias or hyperalgesia.

== Prognosis ==
Anti-Hu paraneoplastic associated sensory neuronopathy carries a poor prognosis, with median survival of less than 1 year and a 20% 36 month survival.

Idiopathic sensory neuronopathy usually does not respond to immunotherapy and the prognosis regarding symptoms control is poor.
