= Peripheral neuropathy =

Nervous system disease affecting nerves beyond the brain and spinal cord

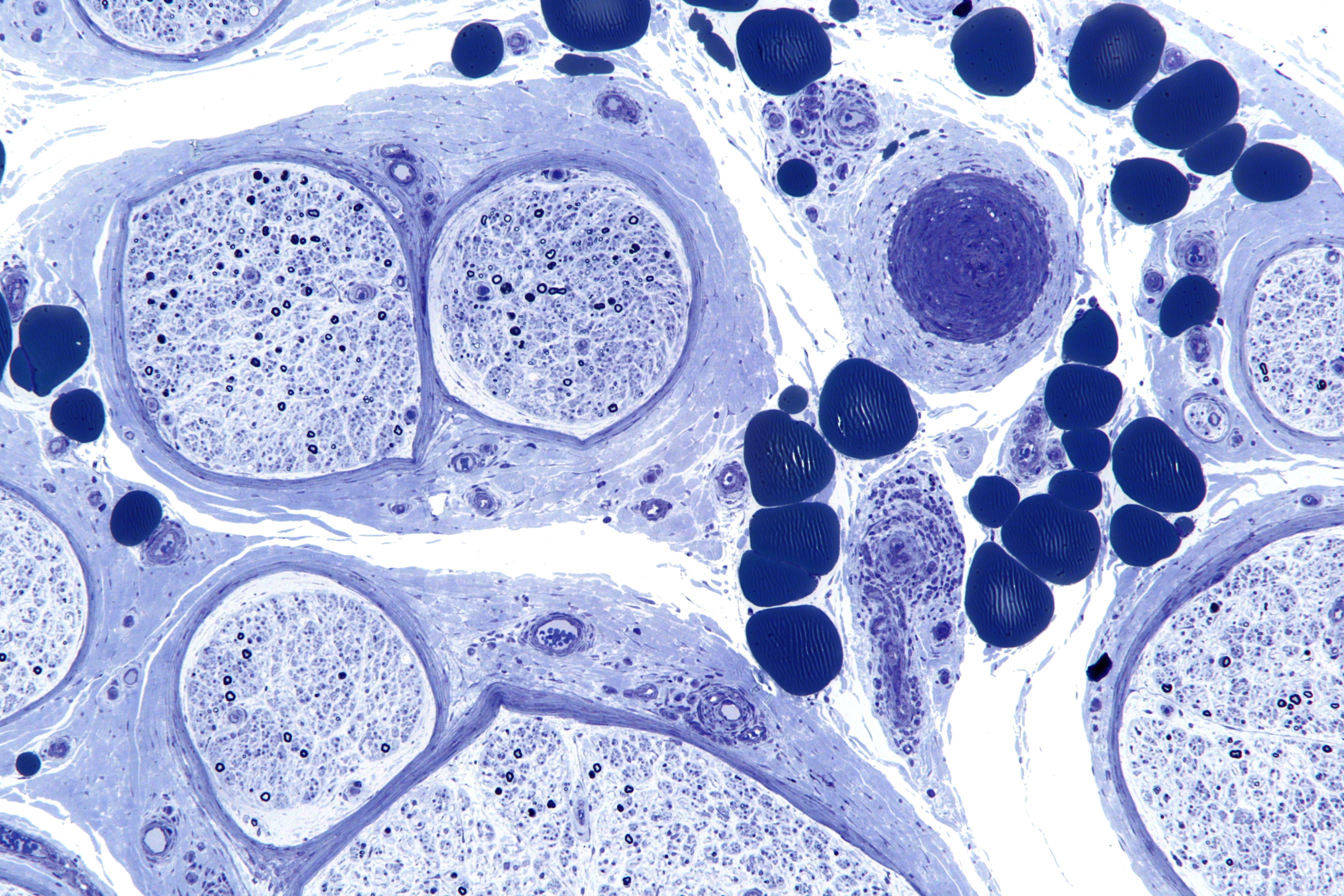
- Micrograph showing a vasculitic peripheral neuropathy; plastic embedded; Toluidine blue stain
- Specialty: Neurology
- Symptoms: Shooting pain, numbness, tingling, tremors, bladder problems, unsteadiness

Peripheral neuropathy, often shortened to neuropathy, is damage or disease affecting the nerves. Damage to nerves may impair sensation, movement, gland function, or organ function depending on which nerve fibers are affected. Neuropathies affecting motor, sensory, or autonomic nerve fibers result in different symptoms. More than one type of fiber may be affected simultaneously. Peripheral neuropathy may be acute (with sudden onset, rapid progress) or chronic (symptoms begin subtly and progress slowly), and may be reversible or permanent.

Common causes include systemic diseases (such as diabetes or leprosy), hyperglycemia-induced glycation, vitamin deficiency such as of vitamin B12, medication (e.g., chemotherapy, or commonly prescribed antibiotics including metronidazole and the fluoroquinolone class of antibiotics such as ciprofloxacin, levofloxacin, moxifloxacin), traumatic injury, ischemia, radiation therapy, excessive alcohol consumption, immune system disease, celiac disease, non-celiac gluten sensitivity, or viral infection. It can also be genetic (present from birth) or idiopathic (no known cause). In conventional medical usage, the word neuropathy (neuro-, "nervous system" and -pathy, "disease of") without modifier usually means peripheral neuropathy.

Neuropathy affecting just one nerve is called "mononeuropathy", and neuropathy involving nerves in roughly the same areas on both sides of the body is called "symmetrical polyneuropathy" or simply "polyneuropathy". When two or more (typically just a few, but sometimes many) separate nerves in disparate areas of the body are affected it is called "mononeuritis multiplex", "multifocal mononeuropathy", or "multiple mononeuropathy".

Neuropathy may cause painful cramps, fasciculations (fine muscle twitching), muscle loss, bone degeneration, and changes in the skin, hair, and nails. Additionally, motor neuropathy may cause impaired balance and coordination or, most commonly, muscle weakness; sensory neuropathy may cause numbness to touch and vibration, reduced position sense causing poorer coordination and balance, reduced sensitivity to temperature change and pain, spontaneous tingling or burning pain, or allodynia (pain from normally nonpainful stimuli, such as light touch), and autonomic neuropathy may produce diverse symptoms, depending on the affected glands and organs, but common symptoms are poor bladder control, abnormal blood pressure or heart rate, and reduced ability to sweat normally.

== Classification ==
Peripheral neuropathy may be classified according to the number and distribution of nerves affected (mononeuropathy, mononeuritis multiplex, or polyneuropathy), the type of nerve fiber predominantly affected (motor, sensory, autonomic), or the process affecting the nerves; e.g., inflammation (neuritis), compression (compression neuropathy), chemotherapy (chemotherapy-induced peripheral neuropathy). The affected nerves are found in an EMG (electromyography) / NCS (nerve conduction study) test and the classification is applied upon exam completion.

=== Mononeuropathy ===
Mononeuropathy is a type of neuropathy that only affects a single nerve. Diagnostically, it is important to distinguish it from polyneuropathy because when a single nerve is affected, it is more likely to be due to localized trauma or infection. Diabetes mellitus is a confounding example due to its diabetic lumbosacral radiculoplexus neuropathy variant, presenting as a single-nerve femoral neuropathy though additional signatures indicate it is not a true femoral neuropathy.

The most common cause of mononeuropathy is physical compression of the nerve, known as compression neuropathy. Carpal tunnel syndrome and axillary nerve palsy are examples. Direct injury to a nerve, interruption of its blood supply resulting in ischemia, or inflammation also may cause mononeuropathy.

=== Polyneuropathy ===
"Polyneuropathy" is a pattern of nerve damage that is quite different from mononeuropathy, often more serious and affecting more areas of the body. The term "peripheral neuropathy" sometimes is used loosely to refer to polyneuropathy. In cases of polyneuropathy, many nerve cells in various parts of the body are affected, without regard to the nerve through which they pass; not all nerve cells are affected in any particular case. In distal axonopathy, one common pattern is that the cell bodies of neurons remain intact, but the axons are affected in proportion to their length; the longest axons are the most affected. Diabetic neuropathy is the most common cause of this pattern. In demyelinating polyneuropathies, the myelin sheath around axons is damaged, which affects axons' ability to conduct electrical impulses. The third and least common pattern directly affects the cell bodies of neurons. This affects the sensory neurons (known as sensory neuronopathy or dorsal root ganglionopathy).

The effect of this is to cause symptoms in more than one part of the body, often symmetrically on the left and right sides. As for any neuropathy, the chief symptoms include motor symptoms such as weakness or clumsiness of movement; and sensory symptoms such as unusual or unpleasant sensations such as tingling or burning; reduced ability to feel sensations such as texture or temperature, and impaired balance when standing or walking. In many polyneuropathies, these symptoms occur first and most severely in the feet. Autonomic symptoms also may occur, such as dizziness on standing up, erectile dysfunction, and difficulty controlling urination.

Polyneuropathies usually are caused by processes that affect the body as a whole. Diabetes and impaired glucose tolerance are the most common causes. Hyperglycemia-induced formation of advanced glycation end-products (AGEs) is related to diabetic neuropathy. Other causes relate to the particular type of polyneuropathy, and there are many different causes of each type, including inflammatory diseases such as Lyme disease, vitamin deficiencies, blood disorders, and toxicants (including alcohol and certain prescribed drugs).

Most types of polyneuropathy progress fairly slowly, over months or years, but rapidly progressive polyneuropathy also occurs. It is important to recognize that at one time it was thought that many of the cases of small fiber peripheral neuropathy with typical symptoms of tingling, pain, and loss of sensation in the feet and hands were due to glucose intolerance before a diagnosis of diabetes or prediabetes. However, in August 2015, the Mayo Clinic published a scientific study in the Journal of the Neurological Sciences showing "no significant increase in...symptoms...in the prediabetes group", and stated that "A search for alternate neuropathy causes is needed in patients with prediabetes."

The treatment of polyneuropathies is aimed firstly at eliminating or controlling the cause, secondly at maintaining muscle strength and physical function, and thirdly at controlling symptoms such as neuropathic pain.

=== Mononeuritis multiplex ===
Mononeuritis multiplex, occasionally termed polyneuritis multiplex, is simultaneous or sequential involvement of individual noncontiguous nerve trunks, either partially or completely, evolving over days to years and typically presenting with acute or subacute loss of sensory and motor function of individual nerves. The pattern of involvement is asymmetric. However, as the disease progresses, deficit(s) becomes more confluent and symmetrical, making it difficult to differentiate from polyneuropathy. Therefore, attention to the pattern of early symptoms is important.

Mononeuritis multiplex is sometimes associated with a deep, aching pain that worsens at night and frequently in the lower back, hip, or leg. In people with diabetes mellitus, mononeuritis multiplex typically is encountered as acute, unilateral, and severe thigh pain followed by weakness of anterior muscle and loss of knee reflex.

Electrodiagnostic medicine studies will show multifocal sensory motor axonal neuropathy.

It is caused by, or associated with, several medical conditions:

- Diabetes mellitus
- Vasculitides: polyarteritis nodosa, granulomatosis with polyangiitis and eosinophilic granulomatosis with polyangiitis. This results in vasculitic neuropathy.
- Immune-mediated diseases, such as rheumatoid arthritis, systemic lupus erythematosus (SLE)
- Infections: leprosy, lyme disease, parvovirus B19, HIV
- Sarcoidosis
- Cryoglobulinemia
- Reactions to exposure to chemical agents, including trichloroethylene and dapsone
- Rarely, following the sting of certain jellyfish, such as the sea nettle

=== Autonomic neuropathy ===
Autonomic neuropathy is a form of polyneuropathy that affects the non-voluntary, non-sensory nervous system (i.e., the autonomic nervous system), affecting mostly the internal organs such as the bladder muscles, the cardiovascular system, the digestive tract, and the genital organs. These nerves are not under a person's conscious control and function automatically. Autonomic nerve fibers form large collections in the thorax, abdomen, and pelvis outside the spinal cord. They have connections with the spinal cord and ultimately the brain, however. Most commonly autonomic neuropathy is seen in persons with long-standing diabetes mellitus types 1 and 2. In most—but not all—cases, autonomic neuropathy occurs alongside other forms of neuropathy, such as sensory neuropathy.

Autonomic neuropathy is one cause of malfunction of the autonomic nervous system, but not the only one; some conditions affecting the brain or spinal cord also may cause autonomic dysfunction, such as multiple system atrophy, and therefore, may cause similar symptoms to autonomic neuropathy.

The signs and symptoms of autonomic neuropathy include the following:

- Urinary bladder conditions: bladder incontinence or urine retention
- Gastrointestinal tract: dysphagia, abdominal pain, nausea, vomiting, malabsorption, fecal incontinence, gastroparesis, diarrhoea, constipation
- Cardiovascular system: disturbances of heart rate (tachycardia, bradycardia), orthostatic hypotension, inadequate increase of heart rate on exertion
- Respiratory system: impairments in the signals associated with regulation of breathing and gas exchange (central sleep apnea, hypopnea, bradypnea).
- Skin: thermal regulation, dryness through sweat disturbances
- Other areas: hypoglycemia unawareness, genital impotence

=== Neuritis ===
Neuritis is a general term for inflammation of a nerve or the general inflammation of the peripheral nervous system. Symptoms depend on the nerves involved, but may include pain, paresthesia (pins-and-needles), paresis (weakness), hypoesthesia (numbness), anesthesia, paralysis, wasting, and disappearance of the reflexes.

Causes of neuritis include

- Physical injury
- Infection
  - Diphtheria
  - Herpes zoster (shingles)
  - Leprosy
  - Lyme disease
- Chemical injury such as chemotherapy
- Radiation therapy

Types of neuritis include

- Brachial neuritis
- Cranial neuritis such as Bell's palsy
- Optic neuritis
- Vestibular neuritis
- Wartenberg's migratory sensory neuropathy
- Underlying conditions including:
  - Alcoholism
  - Autoimmune disease, especially multiple sclerosis and Guillain–Barré syndrome
  - Beriberi (vitamin B_{1} deficiency)
  - Cancer
  - Celiac disease
  - Non-celiac gluten sensitivity
  - Diabetes mellitus (Diabetic neuropathy)
  - Hypothyroidism
  - Porphyria
  - Vitamin B_{12} deficiency
  - Vitamin B_{6} excess

== Signs and symptoms ==
Those with diseases or dysfunctions of their nerves may have problems with normal nerve functions. Symptoms vary depending on the types of nerve fiber involved. In terms of sensory function, symptoms commonly include loss of function ("negative") symptoms, including numbness, tremor, impairment of balance, and gait abnormality. Positive symptoms include pain, itching, crawling, tingling, and pins-and-needles. Motor symptoms include loss of function ("negative") symptoms of weakness, tiredness, muscle atrophy, and gait abnormalities; and gain of function ("positive") symptoms of cramps, and muscle twitch (fasciculations).

In the most common form, length-dependent peripheral neuropathy, pain, and parasthesia appear symmetrically and generally at the terminals of the longest nerve in the lower legs and feet. Sensory symptoms usually develop before motor symptoms such as weakness. Length-dependent peripheral neuropathy symptoms make a slow ascent of the lower limbs, while symptoms may never appear in the upper limbs; if they do, it will be around the time that leg symptoms reach the knee. When the nerves of the autonomic nervous system are affected, symptoms may include constipation, dry mouth, difficulty urinating, and dizziness when standing.

=== CAP-PRI scale for diagnosis ===
A user-friendly, disease-specific, quality-of-life scale can be used to monitor how someone feels with the burden of chronic, sensorimotor polyneuropathy. This scale, called the Chronic, Acquired Polyneuropathy - Patient-reported Index (CAP-PRI), contains only 15 items and is completed by the person affected by polyneuropathy. The total score and individual item scores can be followed over time, with item scoring used by the patient and care provider to estimate the clinical status of some of the more common life domains and symptoms impacted by polyneuropathy.

== Causes ==
The causes are grouped broadly as follows:

- Ribose-5-phosphate isomerase deficiency
- Surgery: LASIK (corneal neuropathy — 20 to 55% of people).
- Genetic diseases: Friedreich's ataxia, Fabry disease, Charcot-Marie-Tooth disease, hereditary neuropathy with liability to pressure palsy
- Hyperglycemia-induced formation of advanced glycation end-products (AGEs)
- Metabolic and endocrine diseases: diabetes mellitus, chronic kidney failure, porphyria, amyloidosis, liver failure, hypothyroidism
- Idiopathic peripheral neuropathy refers to neuropathy with no known cause.
- Toxic causes: drugs (vincristine, metronidazole, phenytoin, nitrofurantoin, isoniazid, ethyl alcohol, statins), organic herbicides TCDD dioxin, organic metals, heavy metals, excess intake of vitamin B_{6} (pyridoxine). Peripheral neuropathies also may result from long-term (more than 21 days) treatment with linezolid.
- Adverse effects of fluoroquinolones: irreversible neuropathy is a serious adverse reaction of fluoroquinolone drugs
- Inflammatory diseases: Guillain–Barré syndrome, systemic lupus erythematosus, leprosy, Sjögren's disease, Babesiosis, Lyme disease, vasculitis, sarcoidosis. Multiple sclerosis may also be causal.
- Vitamin deficiency states: Vitamin B_{12} (Methylcobalamin), vitamin A, vitamin E, vitamin B_{1} (thiamin)
- Physical trauma: compression, automobile accident, sports injury, sports pinching, cutting, projectile injuries (for example, gunshot wound), strokes including prolonged occlusion of blood flow, electric discharge, including lightning strikes
- Effect of chemotherapy – see Chemotherapy-induced peripheral neuropathy
- Exposure to Agent Orange
- Others: Carpal tunnel syndrome, electric shock, HIV, malignant disease, radiation, shingles, MGUS (Monoclonal gammopathy of undetermined significance).

== Diagnosis ==
Peripheral neuropathy may first be considered when an individual reports symptoms of numbness, tingling, and pain in feet. After ruling out a lesion in the central nervous system as a cause, a diagnosis may be made on the basis of symptoms, laboratory and additional testing, clinical history, and a detailed examination.

During physical examination, specifically a neurological examination, those with generalized peripheral neuropathies most commonly have distal sensory or motor and sensory loss, although those with a pathology (problem) of the nerves may be perfectly normal; may show proximal weakness, as in some inflammatory neuropathies, such as Guillain–Barré syndrome; or may show focal sensory disturbance or weakness, such as in mononeuropathies. Classically, ankle jerk reflex is absent in peripheral neuropathy.

A physical examination will involve testing the deep ankle reflex as well as examining the feet for any ulceration. For large fiber neuropathy, an exam will usually show an abnormally decreased sensation to vibration, which is tested with a 128-Hz tuning fork, and diminished sensation of light touch when touched by a nylon monofilament.

Diagnostic tests include electromyography (EMG) and nerve conduction studies (NCSs), which assess large myelinated nerve fibers. Testing for small-fiber peripheral neuropathies often relates to the autonomic nervous system function of small thinly- and unmyelinated fibers. These tests include a sweat test and a tilt table test. Diagnosis of small fiber involvement in peripheral neuropathy may also involve a skin biopsy in which a 3 mm-thick section of skin is removed from the calf by a punch biopsy, and is used to measure the skin intraepidermal nerve fiber density (IENFD), the density of nerves in the outer layer of the skin. Reduced density of the small nerves in the epidermis supports a diagnosis of small-fiber peripheral neuropathy.

In EMG testing, demyelinating neuropathy characteristically shows a reduction in conduction velocity and prolongation of distal and F-wave latencies, whereas axonal neuropathy shows a reduction in amplitude.

Laboratory tests include blood tests for vitamin B_{12} levels, a complete blood count, measurement of thyroid stimulating hormone levels, a comprehensive metabolic panel screening for diabetes and prediabetes, and a serum immunofixation test, which tests for antibodies in the blood.

== Treatment ==
The treatment of peripheral neuropathy varies based on its cause, and treating the underlying condition can help neuropathy treatment. When peripheral neuropathy results from diabetes mellitus or prediabetes, blood sugar management is key to treatment. In prediabetes, strict blood sugar control can significantly alter the course of neuropathy. In peripheral neuropathy that stems from immune-mediated diseases, the underlying condition is treated with intravenous immunoglobulin or steroids. When peripheral neuropathy results from vitamin deficiencies or other disorders, those are treated as well.

=== Medications ===
A range of medications that act on the central nervous system have been used to treat neuropathic pain. Commonly used medications include tricyclic antidepressants (such as nortriptyline, amitriptyline, imapramine, and desipramine), serotonin–norepinephrine reuptake inhibitor (SNRI) medications (duloxetine, venlafaxine, and milnacipran) and antiepileptic medications (gabapentin, pregabalin, oxcarbazepine, zonisamide, levetiracetam, lamotrigine, topiramate, phenytoin, lacosamide, sodium valproate, and carbamazepine). Opioid and opiate medications (such as buprenorphine, morphine, methadone, fentanyl, hydromorphone, tramadol and oxycodone) are also often used to treat neuropathic pain.

As is revealed in many of the Cochrane systematic reviews listed below, studies of these medications for the treatment of neuropathic pain are often methodologically flawed and the evidence is potentially subject to major bias. In general, the evidence does not support the usage of antiepileptic and antidepressant medications for the treatment of neuropathic pain. Better-designed clinical trials and further review from non-biased third parties are necessary to gauge just how useful for patients these medications truly are. Reviews of these systematic reviews are also necessary to assess their failings.

It is also often the case that the aforementioned medications are prescribed for neuropathic pain conditions for which they had not been explicitly tested for which controlled research is severely lacking; or even for which evidence suggests that these medications are not effective. The NHS for example explicitly states that amitriptyline and gabapentin can be used for treating the pain of sciatica. This is despite both the lack of high-quality evidence that demonstrates the efficacy of these medications for that symptom, and also the prominence of generally moderate to high-quality evidence that reveals that antiepileptics in specific, including gabapentin, demonstrate no efficacy in treating it.

==== Antidepressants ====
In general, according to Cochrane's systematic reviews, antidepressants have shown to either be ineffective for the treatment of neuropathic pain or the evidence available is inconclusive. Evidence also tends to be tainted by bias or issues with the methodology.

Cochrane systematically reviewed the evidence for the antidepressants nortriptyline, desipramine, venlafaxine, and milnacipran and in all these cases found scant evidence to support their use for the treatment of neuropathic pain. All reviews were done between 2014 and 2015.

A 2015 Cochrane systematic review of amitriptyline found no evidence supporting amitriptyline that did not possess inherent bias. The authors believe amitriptyline may have an effect in some patients but that the effect is overestimated. A 2014 Cochrane systematic review of imipramine notes that the evidence suggesting benefit were "methodologically flawed and potentially subject to major bias."

A 2017 Cochrane systematic review assessed the benefit of antidepressant medications for several types of chronic non-cancer pains (including neuropathic pain) in children and adolescents and the authors found the evidence inconclusive.

==== Antiepileptics ====
A 2017 Cochrane systematic review found that daily dosages between 1800–3600 mg of gabapentin could provide good pain relief for pain associated with diabetic neuropathy only. This relief occurred for roughly 30–40% of treated patients, while placebo had a 10–20% response. Three of the seven authors of the review had conflicts of interest declared. In a 2019 Cochrane review of pregabalin the authors conclude that there is some evidence of efficacy in the treatment of pain deriving from post-herpetic neuralgia, diabetic neuropathy, and post-traumatic neuropathic pain only. They also warned that many patients treated will have no benefit. Two of the five authors declared receiving payments from pharmaceutical companies.

A 2017 Cochrane systematic review found that oxcarbazepine had little evidence to support its use for treating diabetic neuropathy, radicular pain, and other neuropathies. The authors also call for better studies. In a 2015 Cochrane systematic review the authors found a lack of evidence showing any effectiveness of zonisamide for treating pain deriving from any peripheral neuropathy. A 2014 Cochrane review found that studies of levetiracetam showed no indication of its effectiveness at treating pain from any neuropathy. The authors also found that the evidence was possibly biased and that some patients experienced adverse events.

A 2013 Cochrane systematic review concluded that there was high-quality evidence to suggest that lamotrigine is not effective for treating neuropathic pain, even at high dosages 200–400 mg. A 2013 Cochrane systematic review of topiramate found that the included data had a strong likelihood of major bias; despite this, it found no effectiveness for the drug in treating the pain associated with diabetic neuropathy. It had not been tested for any other type of neuropathy. Cochrane reviews from 2012 of clonazepam and phenytoin uncovered no evidence of sufficient quality to support their use in chronic neuropathic pain."

A 2012 Cochrane systematic review of lacosamide found it very likely that the drug is ineffective for treating neuropathic pain. The authors caution against positive interpretations of the evidence. For sodium valproate the authors of a 2011 Cochrane review found that "three studies no more than hint that sodium valproate may reduce pain in diabetic neuropathy". They discuss how there is a probable overestimate of the effect due to the inherent problems with the data and conclude that the evidence does not support its usage. In a 2014 systematic review of carbamazepine the authors believe the drug benefits some people. No trials were considered greater than level III evidence; none lasted longer than 4 weeks and had poor reporting quality.

A 2017 Cochrane systematic review aiming to assess the benefit of antiepileptic medications for several types of chronic non-cancer pains (including neuropathic pain) in children and adolescents found the evidence inconclusive. Two of the ten authors of this study declared receiving payments from pharmaceutical companies.

==== Opioids ====
A Cochrane review of buprenorphine, fentanyl, hydromorphone, and morphine, all dated between 2015 and 2017, and all for the treatment of neuropathic pain, found that there was insufficient evidence to comment on their efficacy. Conflicts of interest were declared by the authors in this review. A 2017 Cochrane review of methadone found very low-quality evidence, three studies of limited quality, of its efficacy and safety. They could not formulate any conclusions about its relative efficacy and safety compared to a placebo.

For tramadol, Cochrane found that there was only modest information about the benefits of its usage for neuropathic pain. Studies were small, had potential risks of bias and apparent benefits increased with risk of bias. Overall the evidence was of low or very low quality and the authors state that it "does not provide a reliable indication of the likely effect". For oxycodone the authors found very low-quality evidence showing its usefulness in treating diabetic neuropathy and postherpetic neuralgia only. One of the four authors declared receiving payments from pharmaceutical companies.

More generally, a large-scale 2013 review found opioids to be more effective for intermediate-term use than short-term use, but couldn't properly assess effectiveness for chronic use because of insufficient data. Most recent guidelines on the pharmacotherapy of neuropathic pain however are in agreement with the results of this review and recommend the use of opioids. A 2017 Cochrane review examining mainly propoxyphene therapy as a treatment for many non-cancer pain syndromes (including neuropathic pain) concluded, "There was no evidence from randomised controlled trials to support or refute the use of opioids to treat chronic non-cancer pain in children and adolescents."

==== Others ====
A 2016 Cochrane review of paracetamol for the treatment of neuropathic pain concluded that its benefit alone or in combination with codeine or dihydrocodeine is unknown.

Few studies have examined whether nonsteroidal anti-inflammatory drugs are effective in treating peripheral neuropathy.

There is some evidence that symptomatic relief from the pain of peripheral neuropathy may be obtained by the topical application of capsaicin. Capsaicin is the factor that causes heat in chili peppers. However, the evidence suggesting that capsaicin applied to the skin reduces pain for peripheral neuropathy is of moderate to low quality and should be interpreted carefully before this treatment is used.

Evidence supports the use of cannabinoids for some forms of neuropathic pain. A 2018 (updated in 2026) Cochrane review of cannabis-based medicines for the treatment of chronic neuropathic pain included 16 studies. All of these studies included THC as a pharmacological component of the test group. The authors rated the quality of evidence as very low to moderate. The primary outcome was quoted as, "Cannabis-based medicines may increase the number of people achieving 50% or greater pain relief compared with placebo" but "the evidence for improvement in Patient Global Impression of Change (PGIC) with cannabis to be of very low quality". The authors also conclude, "The potential benefits of cannabis-based medicine... might be outweighed by their potential harms."

A 2014 Cochrane review of topical lidocaine for the treatment of various peripheral neuropathies found its usage supported by a few low-quality studies. The authors state that no high-quality randomised control trials demonstrate its efficacy or safety profile.

A 2015 (updated in 2022) Cochrane review of topical clonidine for the treatment of diabetic neuropathy included two studies of 8 and 12 weeks in length; both of which compared topical clonidine to placebo and both of which were funded by the same drug manufacturer. The review found that topical clonidine may provide some benefit versus placebo. However, the authors state that the included trials are potentially subject to significant bias and that the evidence is of low to moderate quality.

A 2007 Cochrane review of aldose reductase inhibitors for the treatment of pain deriving from diabetic polyneuropathy found it no better than a placebo.

=== Medical devices ===
Transcutaneous electrical nerve stimulation (TENS) therapy is often used to treat various types of neuropathy. A 2010 review of three trials, for the treatment of diabetic neuropathy explicitly, involving a total of 78 patients found some improvement in pain scores after 4 and 6 but not 12 weeks of treatment and an overall improvement in neuropathic symptoms at 12 weeks. Another 2010 review of four trials, for the treatment of diabetic neuropathy, found significant improvement in pain and overall symptoms, with 38% of patients in one trial becoming asymptomatic. The treatment remains effective even after prolonged use, but symptoms return to baseline within a month of cessation of treatment.

These older reviews can be balanced with a more recent 2017 review of TENS for neuropathic pain by Cochrane which concluded that "This review is unable to state the effect of TENS versus sham TENS for pain relief due to the very low quality of the included evidence... The very low quality of evidence means we have very limited confidence in the effect estimate reported." A very low quality of evidence means, 'multiple sources of potential bias' with a 'small number and size of studies'.

=== Surgery ===
Peripheral neuropathy due to nerve compression is treatable with a nerve decompression. When a nerve is subject to localized pressure or stretching, the vascular supply is interrupted leading to a cascade of physiological changes that causes nerve injury. In a nerve decompression, a surgeon explores the entrapment site and removes tissue around the nerve to relieve pressure. Common sites of entrapment are spaces of anatomic narrowing such as osteofibrous tunnels (e.g. carpal tunnel in carpal tunnel syndrome). In many cases the potential for nerve recovery (full or partial) after decompression is excellent, as chronic nerve compression is associated with low-grade nerve injury (Sunderland classification I–III) rather than high-grade nerve injury (Sunderland classification IV–V). Nerve decompressions for properly selected patients are associated with a significant reduction in pain, in some cases the complete elimination of pain.

In people with diabetic peripheral neuropathy, two reviews make a case for nerve decompression surgery as an effective means of pain relief and support claims for protection from foot ulceration. There is less evidence for efficacy of surgery for non-diabetic peripheral neuropathy of the legs and feet. One uncontrolled study that did before/after comparisons with a minimum of one-year follow-up reported improvements in pain relief, impaired balance, and numbness. "There was no difference in outcomes between patients with diabetic versus idiopathic neuropathy in response to nerve decompression." There are no placebo-controlled trials for idiopathic peripheral neuropathy in the published scientific literature.

=== Diet ===
According to a review, strict gluten-free diet is an effective treatment when neuropathy is caused by gluten sensitivity, with or without the presence of digestive symptoms or intestinal injury.

=== Counselling ===
A 2015 review on the treatment of neuropathic pain with psychological therapy concluded that "There is insufficient evidence of the efficacy and safety of psychological interventions for chronic neuropathic pain. The two available studies show no benefit of treatment over either waiting list or placebo control groups."

=== Alternative medicine ===
A 2019 Cochrane review of the treatment of herbal medicinal products for people with neuropathic pain for at least three months concluded that "There was insufficient evidence to determine whether nutmeg or St John's wort has any meaningful efficacy in neuropathic pain conditions. The quality of the current evidence raises serious uncertainties about the estimates of effect observed, therefore, we have very little confidence in the effect estimate; the true effect is likely to be substantially different from the estimate of effect."

A 2017 Cochrane review on the usage of acupuncture as a treatment for neuropathic pain concludes, "Due to the limited data available, there is insufficient evidence to support or refute the use of acupuncture for neuropathic pain in general, or for any specific neuropathic pain condition when compared with sham acupuncture or other active therapies." Also, "Most studies included a small sample size (fewer than 50 participants per treatment arm) and all studies were at high risk of bias for blinding of participants and personnel." Also, the authors state, "we did not identify any study comparing acupuncture with treatment as usual."

Alpha lipoic acid (ALA) with benfotiamine is a proposed pathogenic treatment for painful diabetic neuropathy only. The results of two systematic reviews state that oral ALA produced no clinically significant benefit, intravenous ALA administered over three weeks may improve symptoms and that long-term treatment has not been investigated.

== Research ==
A 2008 literature review concluded that "based on principles of evidence-based medicine and evaluations of methodology, there is only a 'possible' association of celiac disease and peripheral neuropathy due to lower levels of evidence and conflicting evidence. There is not yet convincing evidence of causality."

A 2019 review concluded that "gluten neuropathy is a slowly progressive condition. About 25% of the patients will have evidence of enteropathy on biopsy (CD [celiac disease]) but the presence or absence of an enteropathy does not influence the positive effect of a strict gluten-free diet."

Stem-cell therapy is also being examined as a possible means to repair peripheral nerve damage but efficacy has not yet been demonstrated.

== See also ==
- Giant axonal neuropathy – Neurological disorder
- Scrambler therapy – Type of pain relief therapy
- Sensory neuronopathy – Sensory neuropathy caused by damage of nerve cells in the dorsal root ganglion
