= Chronic critical illness =

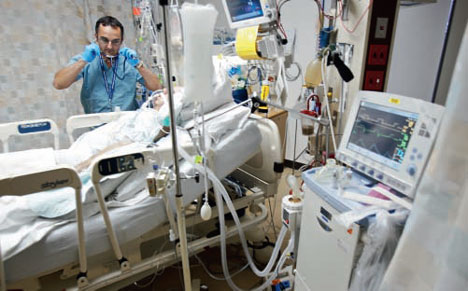
A respiratory therapist examining a mechanically ventilated patient on an Intensive Care Unit; protracted mechanical ventilation is a hallmark of chronic critical illness

Chronic critical illness is a disease state which affects intensive care patients who have survived an initial insult but remain dependent on intensive care for a protracted period, neither dying nor recovering. The most characteristic clinical feature is a prolonged requirement for mechanical ventilation. Other features include profound weakness associated with critical illness polyneuropathy and myopathy, increased susceptibility to infection, metabolic changes and hormonal changes. There may be protracted or permanent delirium, or other marked cognitive impairment. The physical and psychological symptoms of the disease are very severe, including a propensity to develop post traumatic stress syndrome.

Strict definitions of chronic critical illness vary. One definition is the requirement for mechanical ventilation for 21 days or more. It is estimated that 5-10% of patients who require mechanical ventilation as part of their initial illness will go on to develop chronic critical illness. Overall prevalence has been estimated at 34.4 per 100 000 of the population. Most adult patients do not survive chronic critical illness, and furthermore even those who are discharged from hospital frequently die soon after discharge. One-year mortality in adults is 48-68%. However, children fare better with two-thirds surviving to 5 years or beyond.

== See also ==
- Post-intensive care syndrome
