= Post-intensive care syndrome =

Collection of health disorders among survivors of critical illness

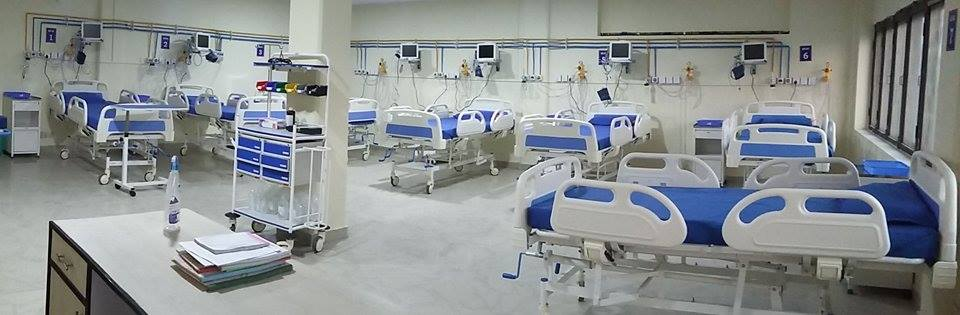
Image of an intensive care unit

Post-intensive care syndrome (PICS) describes a collection of symptoms related to physical, psychosocial, and cognitive health and function that are new or worsened in patients who survive critical illness (e.g., severe infection, heart attack, cardiac arrest, stroke, etc.) and/or life-threatening traumatic injuries and admission to intensive care. The range of symptoms that PICS describes falls under three broad categories: physical impairment, cognitive impairment, and psychiatric impairment. A person with PICS may have symptoms from one or multiple of these categories. Additionally, family members are also simultaneously affected by their loved ones' intensive care unit (ICU) experience and caregiving for them afterwards. This has been recognized as post-intensive care syndrome-family (PICS-F).

Improvements in survival after a critical illness have led to research focused on long-term outcomes for these patients. This improved survival has also led to the discovery of significant functional disabilities that many survivors of critical illness experience. Because the majority of literature in critical care medicine is focused on short-term outcomes (e.g. survival), the current understanding of PICS is relatively limited. Recent research suggests that there is significant overlap among the three broad categories of symptoms. Also, sedation and prolonged immobilization seem to be common themes among patients who have PICS.

The term PICS arose around 2010, at least in part, to raise awareness of the important long-term dysfunctions resulting from treatment in the intensive care unit (ICU). Awareness of these long-term functional disabilities is growing, and research is ongoing to further clarify the spectrum of disabilities and to find more effective ways to prevent these long-term complications and to more effectively treat functional recovery. Increased awareness in the medical community has also highlighted the need for more hospital and community-based resources to more effectively identify and treat patients with PICS after surviving a critical illness.

Grouping these impairments together within a syndrome was done to increase awareness of post-critical illness issues. However, an updated definition was required to accommodate new knowledge on PICS. A current and holistic definition of PICS is the new or worsening impairment to the physical, mental, cognitive, employment, and/or social domains of health following critical illness. These five impairments are the defining characteristics of PICS.

== Origins ==
Before the term PICS was created, there was recognition of the ramifications of critical illness. In 1892, Osler was the first to note the "rapid loss of flesh", or muscle wasting, in patients with prolonged sepsis (Osler, 1892, as cited in Jolley et al., 2016, p. 1129). In 1998, researchers found that critically ill patients experienced poorer mental health and more post-traumatic stress disorder (PTSD) symptoms, than non-critically ill patients. In 1999, it was discovered many survivors of critical illness had cognitive impairments. As research on the impairment to physical, mental, and cognitive health resulting from critical illness accumulated, the significance and relationship of these long-term issues was recognized. This resulted in the 2010 multidisciplinary conference where the term PICS was created. The impairments to physical, mental, and cognitive health grouped within PICS increased awareness, research, and education on consequences observed in survivors of critical illness.

As intended, PICS research continued and additional impairments became evident. In the 2010s, researchers noted social dysfunction in survivors of critical illness. Impaired employment following critical illness has appeared in the literature since 1995. However, the recognition that unemployment due to critical illness can negatively affect well-being and quality of life, is a recent finding. Despite the evidence of impairment to employment and social health following critical illness, there has been a reluctance to include these impairments within the PICS definition. This demonstrates the original PICS definition is outdated and overly focused on the biomedical model of health. In order to care for PICS, clinicians and researchers need to recognize all impairments experienced by survivors of critical illness. Using a holistic perspective, these social and employment impairments can be recognized within PICS and attended to appropriately.

== Conditions ==
The most recognized form of the syndrome is the physical dysfunction commonly known as ICU-acquired weakness. The other physical, cognitive, and mental health impairments are less well recognized and need further research to be better understood.

=== Physical impairment ===
ICU-acquired weakness (ICU-AW), sometimes called critical illness polyneuropathy, is the most common form of physical impairment, and is estimated to occur in 25 percent or more of ICU survivors. It is thought to be an effect of long-term immobility and deep sedation that many critically ill patients experience while in the ICU. In addition, severe infections and inflammation are significant risk factors for developing ICU-AW.

ICU-AW often presents as difficulty performing activities of daily living (e.g. moving around the living environment, using the bathroom, ability to make meals or do laundry). Inability to effectively perform these tasks can be particularly distressing to patients. The deficits associated with ICU-AW have a direct and negative effect on a person's independence. The natural course of ICU-AW is variable, but some patients recover within a year.

Other physical impairments include joint contractures due to long periods of immobility while hospitalized. The elbow and ankle are the most commonly affected joints, followed by the hip and knee. Some physical weakness may result from malnutrition during critical illness. Though nutrition may be provided by tube-feeding or parenteral nutrition, the initiation of parenteral nutrition may be delayed, and interruptions in feeding often occur due to gastrointestinal intolerance or the performance of procedures that require an empty stomach. In people who experience acute respiratory distress syndrome and are treated with mechanical ventilation, lung function is often compromised for months to years. The most commonly impaired lung function is diffusing capacity for carbon monoxide, as well as reduced lung volumes and spirometry.

=== Cognitive impairment ===
Cognitive impairments include deficits in memory, attention, mental processing speed, and problem-solving. These impairments affect up to 80% of individuals who survive a critical illness. Impairments in memory and executive function have the most profound effect in terms of prohibiting people from engaging in the tasks and behaviors needed to function effectively in daily life and carry out complex cognition. The effect of cognitive dysfunction is significant – unemployment is not uncommon because of difficulties with tasks of executive function (e.g. completing regular tasks like balancing a checkbook, and remembering facts or events). Among individuals with PICS-associated cognitive impairments, most patients improve or completely resolve over the first year.

Major risk factors for cognitive impairment following ICU admission due to critical illness include delirium, prior cognitive deficit, sepsis, and acute respiratory distress syndrome (ARDS). It is currently believed that many factors can play a role in causing cognitive impairment following critical illness. Some possible mechanisms for include poor blood supply to the brain due to low blood pressure from sepsis, poor oxygen supply to the brain due to respiratory distress and impairment, inflammation of the brain, and disruption of the blood–brain barrier in the areas of the brain that are involved in executive function and memory.

=== Psychiatric impairment ===
Depression and anxiety are the two most common mental health disorders seen in individuals with PICS. The range of possible mental health problems, however, is far wider. Dementia, post-traumatic stress disorder (PTSD), and persistent delusional behavior are also manifestations of the syndrome. Although not completely understood, the anxiety and delusions seen in patients with PICS are likely linked to delusional memories that some individuals acquire during their stay in the ICU, rather than recall of factual memories. It is thought that medically induced sedation may contribute to the formation of delusional memories by raising the risk of delirium and hallucinations.

Risk factors are similar to those for cognitive impairment following critical illness, and include severe sepsis, acute respiratory distress syndrome, respiratory failure, trauma, hypoglycemia, and hypoxemia. Like ICU-acquired weakness, long-term immobility and deep sedation have been known to play an important part in the development of mental health problems seen in PICS. Sleep pattern disturbance, a common problem in the ICU, is also a likely culprit. Lower education level, pre-existing disability, alcohol use disorder, pre-existing anxiety, depression, and PTSD are also risk factors for PICS-related mental health disorders. Contrary to earlier believes, neither age nor sex have shown to be risk factors for either depressive states or anxiety. The estimated prevalence of mental disorders after intensive care varies. Meta analyses have shown a prevalence for depressive symptoms after intensive care between 4%-64%, and between 5%-73% for anxiety. The fact that papers often uses different methods to estimate prevalence on mental disorders after intensive care, i.e. different types of self reporting forms, diagnose codes, and different time points at data collection is a big contributor to the big variety in prevalence estimation.

The natural history for mental health disorders following critical illness is not well known, likely due to lack of recognition that these psychiatric symptoms may be related to a remote ICU admission. With proper psychological and psychiatric help, mental illness related to PICS can be successfully managed, but research favors preventative strategies as the most effective management. While there are ongoing studies focused on determining the best way to treat and prevent psychiatric problems following critical illness, daily diaries, so-called "ICU diaries" seem to be the most promising. These ICU diaries appear to be effective in treating the delusional, false memories that some of these individuals develop. Healthcare providers, especially clinical social workers who specialize in medical care, can be very helpful in advocating these practices and facilitating them for patients and families.

=== Social impairment ===
Social impairment in PICS is a negative change to a patient's social health. This is exhibited in people living with PICS as avoiding socialization, loss of previous social roles, reduced social confidence, or perceiving themselves as a social burden. Despite recognition of this impairment in research, many authors omit social impairment from the PICS definition. Without recognition of these impairments, critical care survivors may not be provided with education, resources, and support regarding new PICS social dysfunctions

=== Employment impairment ===
Employment impairment in PICS is the patient's inability to return to their previous position of employment as a result of critical illness. This is a well-documented impairment that has not previously been included in the definition of PICS. Employment is critical to health and wellbeing as it provides daily structure, financial security, identity, autonomy, opportunities for development, and regular social engagement. When considering PICS holistically, it can be recognized employment impairment is significant an individual's life and needs to be considered within the PICS definition.

== PICS-Family (PICS-F) ==
Episodes of critical illness also impact families and caregivers which in turn can affect those recovering from their critical illness. Increasing awareness of PICS has also brought to light a set of psychological symptoms that family members of critically ill patients often experience. Recognition of these set of symptoms has given rise to the term PICS-Family (PICS-F). Approximately 10-35% of family members may experience symptoms of depression while their loved one is in the ICU, and these symptoms persist in 4-35% of family members 3–12 months after discharge from the ICU or hospital. Family members may be affected by anxiety even more commonly, with reports of up to 40-70% of family members reporting symptoms of anxiety while their loved one in the ICU and this rate remains high at 10-50% 3–12 months after discharge. Family members are also at risk for developing symptoms of post-traumatic stress disorder, and for developing prolonged disorder. There are several factors that may contribute to the development of PICS including poor sleep while their loved one is in the ICU, pre-existing physical or mental health conditions, being a family member of a younger patients in the ICU or the family member of an elderly patient (increased caregiver sense of responsibility), severity of the patient's illness, being the spouse or parent of the patient, low social support, low socioeconomic status, low satisfaction with health care team and hospital staff, and low satisfaction with the patients care.

There may be some basis for the development of PICS-F in the anxiety and false memories that these family members develop during the course of the critical illness. These symptoms can cause caregivers to stop maintaining their own health. Family members can also feel overwhelmed when they are asked to make unexpected life and death decisions about the care of their loved ones. But like the mental health problems in PICS, PICS-F symptoms can be successfully managed with proper recognition and treatment. ICU staff can support family members by having flexible visiting hours, daily family meetings, areas for sleep, allowing family members to participate as much as is appropriate in the care of the patient (e.g. family presence during resuscitation and procedures, family presence during rounds, family involvement in end-of-life care, any other bedside participation), encouraging the use of ICU diaries where patients and family members can write down what they observe and their experiences and questions which allows staff to read the entries and better address concerns, stress management training, screening for anxiety, depression, sleep difficulties, and post-traumatic stress disorder prior to the patient's discharge from the ICU and referral to resources if it is appropriate.

== Treatment ==
=== Screening ===
Professional organization guidelines recommend screening in patients with the following risk factors that place them at high-risk for PICS.

Cognitive risk-factors: pre-existing cognitive dysfunction, development and duration of delirium during ICU stay, sedation with medication (benzodiazepines), sepsis, shock, hypoxia, acute respiratory distress syndrome, and life-support such as invasive mechanical ventilation.

Physical risk-factors: Pre-existing functional disability, pre-existing frailty, and pre-existing cognitive impairment.

Psychological risk-factors: Pre-existing mental health problems, bad memories from experiences that occurred in the ICU, new or worsening signs and symptoms of anxiety, depression, or post-traumatic stress disorder early after discharge from the hospital or ICU.

Screening should be performed within the first month of discharge. Recommended screening tools include the Montreal Cognitive Assessment; Hospital Anxiety and Depression Scale; Impact of Event Scale-Revised; 6-minute walk test; and/or the EuroQol-5D-5L.

=== Prevention ===
Prevention remains the primary focus of managing PICS. When strategies at primary prevention have failed, recognizing the syndrome and its long-term effects have been a significant step in effectively treating PICS.

Limiting deep sedation and immobility and bed-rest have had the largest impact in preventing the long-term functional deficits seen in PICS. Attention to sleep hygiene while in the ICU also seems to be an important part of prevention. Early recognition and treatment of delirium appears to decrease the incidence of PICS. Early, aggressive physical and occupational therapy have had a positive effect. In addition, a focused effort by the ICU health care team should reinforce the importance to family and patients regarding maintaining self-care including hygiene, adequate sleep and nutrition during and after the course of ICU stay.

=== Other treatments, long-term follow-up measures and resources ===
Because PICS represents a range of disorders, no single treatment is likely to adequately address all the symptoms associated with the syndrome. Care can be sought from a variety of professionals, including primary care physicians, nurse practitioners, physical and occupational therapists, dietitians, clinical social workers trained in medical social work, psychiatrists and psychologists. In addition, there is a growing trend of dedicated follow-up clinics for ICU patients that show some promise for recognizing and triaging patients. They often offer support groups for patients and families affected by PICS and PICS-F.

Patients and caregivers should look for signs and symptoms associated with PICS or PICS-F including muscle weakness, fatigue, trouble with daily activities, memory or thinking problems, anxiety and depression, or nightmares and unwanted memories after leaving the ICU. If these symptoms are recognized, consulting a primary care doctor or other caregiver can help. Many other specialists can be enlisted to help patients recover including occupational or physical therapists, dietitians, medically trained clinical social workers, psychiatrists or psychologists, and speech therapists. Patients and families who have questions or concerns regarding PICS or PICS-F should refer to their local hospital and ICU for available resources.

=== Holistic understanding ===
The original definition of PICS, including impairment to physical, mental, and cognitive health, is focused on physical and biological health. However, the impairments faced by survivors of critical illness extend beyond biomedical health, as evidenced by impairment to social health and employment. A patient's social and economic conditions are considered to be social determinants of health and can affect their daily life, well-being, and health. For example, an individual with PICS may find themselves physically recovered with lasting deficits in memory and concentration (cognitive impairment), an inability to return to work (employment impairment), and an inability to participant in social situations (social impairment). Their social impairment may damage their social support system. Unemployment could lead to stress, financial issues, and poor mental health. Social and employment impairment could significantly alter their life. By defining PICS holistically, to include the five impairments previously outlined, research and education can be catered towards preventing, mitigating, or resolving these issues.

A holistic understanding of PICS can assist in educating patients and families on life after critical illness. For example, the social isolation and vulnerability felt by many survivors of critical illness, could be mitigated through educating patients on PICS social impairment and providing appropriate resources. Education can empower patients and families. By providing comprehensive education on PICS impairments, ICU patients and families will be aware of symptoms to monitor for post-discharge and understand resources are available as needed. In a UK study, PICS patients reported not accessing mental health resources they needed due to lack of education. While this may be reflective of mental health stigma, it also demonstrates the important role education can play in a PICS patient's recovery. Informed patients and families have a better opportunity to advocate for themselves, access appropriate resources, and be involved in their care.

=== Nursing ===
The basic nursing assessment requires a holistic and patient-centered perspective. This is one reason nurses are suited to holistically assess patients for PICS and create individualized care plans. PICS is not a medical diagnosis, but rather a syndrome. As such, nurses can assess patients for PICS impairments, identify their goals for recovery, and provide appropriate resources or referrals. These nursing actions can take place at any point in the patient's recovery. For example, the ICU nurse may put in a long-term disability referral for a patient who is likely to survive ICU with new physical deficits. Furthermore, a home care nurse could suggest a peer-support group for a PICS patient with new social dysfunctions. Nurses are in an opportune position to assist PICS patients with their holistic needs and help them navigate the healthcare system.

PICS encompasses the impairment to physical, mental, cognitive, employment, and social health following critical illness. The understanding of PICS has evolved from its original, biomedical definition. A holistic perspective is required for PICS in order to recognize the full range of impairments experienced after critical illness. Nurses are equipped with a holistic and patient-centered perspective that is useful in the care, education, and research regarding PICS. The comprehensive, holistic, and modern definition of PICS can improve the care of critical illness survivors from this day forward.
