= Charles Francis Bolton =

Canadian neurologist

Charles Francis Bolton FRCPC
- Born: 1932 (age 93–94)
- Education: Queen's University; University of Saskatchewan; Mayo Clinic
- Occupation: professor of neurology
- Spouse: Margaret Katherine Kline (m. 1956)

Charles Francis Bolton (born 1932), is a Canadian professor of neurology at Queen's University in Ontario, Canada. He was first to describe critical illness polyneuropathy in a series of patients.

Bolton earned his medical degree from Queen's University. He then trained in neurology at the University of Saskatchewan and subsequently at Mayo Clinic in Minnesota. He also trained in electromyography at Mayo Clinic.

He has investigated and written extensively on neurological complications in the intensive care unit, especially of a neuromuscular nature. He has also described techniques for electrophysiological investigations of the neuromuscular respiratory system.

== Biography ==
=== Family History ===
Bolton was born in Outlook, Saskatchewan, Canada in 1932. A paternal great, great grandfather, James Bolton, founded the town of Bolton, Ontario in 1822. Charles Bolton's father, Frank R. Bolton, was an officer in First World War and Second World War, and was President (1940–41) of the Saskatchewan Teachers' Federation. His uncle, Lambert Ernest Stanley Bolton, killed in World War I, was honored by having Mount Bolton in the Canadian Rockies named after him. His mother, Mary Grace, graduated from St. Olaf College, Northfield, MN, USA and was a member of the famous St. Olaf Choir. In 1956, Bolton married Margaret Katherine (née Lawford, BA, University of Saskatchewan) while she was working for the Department of Public Health in the Swift Current Health Unit; one of the forerunners of Medicare (Canada). Margaret's mother, Dorothy K. Kline, was an esteemed biochemist at the University of Saskatchewan. Bolton and Margaret together had David, Katherine and Nancy (Turock).

=== Education ===
Bolton graduated from Queen's University, Canada, in 1956. He trained in neurology at the University of Saskatchewan, and at the Mayo Clinic where he was influenced by Dr. Peter Dyck, authority on peripheral neuropathy, and Dr. Edward Lambert, Director of the EMG Laboratory.

=== Career ===
Before specializing in neurology, he was in family practice in Saskatchewan for three years. From 1966 to 1973 he was at the University of Saskatchewan where he and colleagues described the beneficial effects of successful kidney transplantation on uremic neuropathy. From 1973 to 2000 he was at the University of Western Ontario where he was Chief of Clinical Neurological Sciences and Director of the EMG Laboratory at Victoria Hospital (London, Ontario). While there he and colleagues described critical illness polyneuropathy, a severe weakness of the muscles of breathing and limb movement, observed in the intensive care unit (ICU), and reversible if the critical illness could be successfully treated. This initiated worldwide investigations of weakness in these patients, and sparked interest in neurological conditions in ICU's. Bolton published widely on neurological conditions, clinical neurophysiology, and the nervous system control of breathing. He spearheaded in Canada the establishment of formal examinations in electromyography, and the subspecialty of neurocritical care.

=== Awards ===
In 1997 he received the Deans Award for Excellence (Research) at the University of Western Ontario. In 1999 he was honored by a two-day Festschrift at the University of Western Ontario. In 2003 he received the Distinguished Physician Award at the 50th Anniversary of the American Association of Electrodiagnostic Medicine. In 2013 he received the Schwab Award at the Annual Meeting of the American Clinical Neurophysiology Society.
