= Facial onset sensory and motor neuronopathy =

Rare disorder of the nervous system

Facial onset sensory and motor neuronopathy, often abbreviated FOSMN, is a rare disorder of the nervous system in which sensory and motor nerves of the face and limbs progressively degenerate over a period of months to years. This degenerative process, the cause of which is unknown, eventually results in sensory and motor symptoms — the former consisting mainly of paresthesia followed by numbness, and the latter in muscle weakness, atrophy, and eventual paralysis. FOSM is characterized by sensory and motor loss beginning in the face and spreading to involve an increasingly larger area including the scalp, upper arms and trunk. The muscles or respiration and swallowing are commonly affected. In many ways, it is reminiscent of the much better known condition amyotrophic lateral sclerosis, with which it is closely related. There is no cure; treatment is supportive. Life expectancy may be shortened by respiratory complications arising from weakness of the muscles that aid breathing and swallowing. It was first described in four patients by Vucic and colleagues working at the Massachusetts General Hospital in the United States; subsequent reports from the United Kingdom, Europe and Asia point to a global incidence of the disease. It is thought to be exceptionally rare, with only approximately 100 individuals described to date in the medical literature.

== Signs and symptoms ==
The sensory symptoms in FOSM start in the distribution of the trigeminal nerve with paresthesias and numbness and characteristically spread from the head to lower parts of the body; involving the scalp, neck, shoulders and upper extremities. The lower extremities are sometimes also affected. The trigeminal involvement may be unilateral or bilateral at onset. Lower motor neuron involvement may start at the same time as sensory involvement or soon afterwards and also spreads in a head to lower body sequence. Bulbar symptoms due to involvement of the cranial nerves are very common; which often leads to difficulties with swallowing or respirations. This may necessitate placement of a feeding tube or non-invasive ventilation. Lower motor neuron symptoms commonly seen in FOSMN commonly include weakness, fasciculations, difficulties with speech and trouble swallowing. Whereas lower motor neuron signs is observed in all cases of FOSMN, upper motor neuron associated weakness, which presents as brisk reflexes sometimes with clonus and a positive Babinski Sign, is also seen but is less common. In approximately 50% of cases symptoms are initially asymmetric; affecting one side of the body, with eventual progression to the other side. In cases of asymmetric spread; the initially affected side may have more severe symptoms. Although most features of FOSMN reflect lower motor neuron impairment some findings have suggested upper motor neuron impairment in FOSMN.

Frontotemporal dementia, including the behavioral variant, is a co-morbid condition associated with FOSMN.

== Cause ==
The etiology of FOSMN is unknown but it is thought to involve a neurodegenerative or autoimmune process. Some people with FOSMN were positive for various auto-antibodies and others had partial symptom improvement in response to various immunotherapies suggesting a possible autoimmune pathophysiology. Abnormal TAR DNA-binding protein 43 (TDP-43) deposits were found on autopsy in the nerves of some with FOSMN. Abnormal TDP-43 deposits are seen in 98% of cases of ALS and are also commonly found in frontotemporal dementia. The pathological TDP-43 deposits suggest a neurodegenerative cause of FOSMN with pathophysiology closely linked to that of ALS and frontotemporal dementia.

== Diagnosis ==
As with many neurological diseases, there is no test that is diagnostic of FOSMN. The diagnosis can be notoriously difficult, mainly on account of its rarity. Diagnosis is based on clinical signs and symptoms with exclusion of similar conditions. There are no validated diagnostic criteria. The principal differential diagnosis to consider is amyotrophic lateral sclerosis or a related motor neuron disorder: the chief distinction between the two is the presence of sensory abnormalities in FOSMN, and their absence in the motor neuron disorders. Diagnostic tests such as nerve conduction studies, electromyography, cerebrospinal fluid analyses, and blood tests can help narrow the diagnostic possibilities and support a clinical diagnosis. Neurophysiology studies show a generalized sensory and motor neuronopathy which is most severe cranially.

== Treatment ==
There is currently no cure for FOSMN. Those with severe disease often require a feeding tube as swallowing is impaired. Those with weakness affecting the muscles of respiration may require non-invasive ventilation. There have been case reports of symptom improvement after immunotherapy, suggesting a possible immune mediated etiology.

== Prognosis ==
The rate of disease progression is extremely variable with survival ranging from 14 months to 46 years. Of those who died from FOSMN, the mean duration of disease was 7.5 years. Cranial nerve (bulbar) weakness is a common causes of death in those with FOSM, with aspiration pneumonia or respiratory failure commonly leading to death.
