= ELAV-like protein 3 =

Protein-coding gene in the species Homo sapiens

ELAVL3
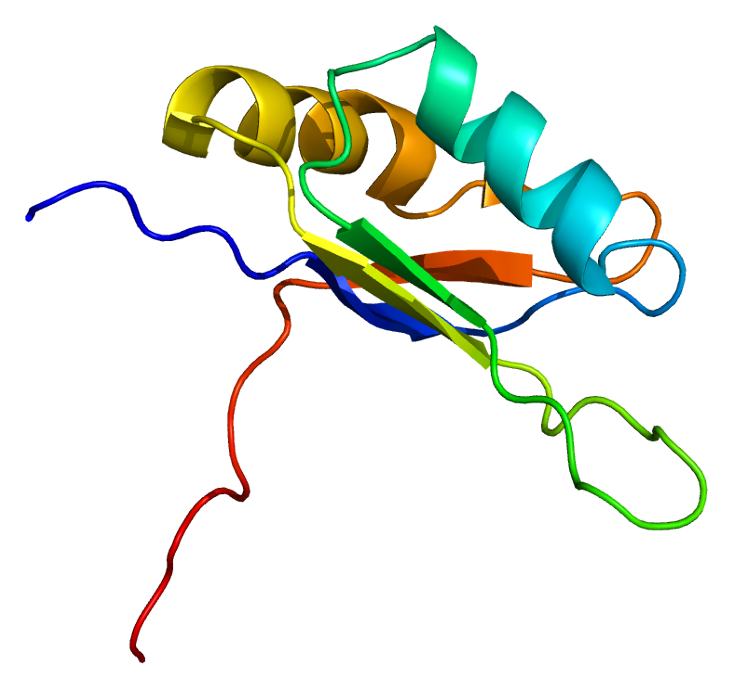

Identifiers
- Aliases: ELAVL3, HUC, HUCL, PLE21, ELAV like neuron-specific RNA binding protein 3, ELAV like RNA binding protein 3
- External IDs: OMIM: 603458; MGI: 109157; GeneCards: ELAVL3
Available structures
PDB	Ortholog search: PDBe RCSB
PDB	List of PDB id codes 1D8Z, 1D9A, 1FNX

Gene location (Human)
Chr.	Chromosome 19 (human)
Band	19p13.2	Start	11,451,326 bp
Band	19p13.2	End	11,481,046 bp

Gene location (Mouse)
Chr.	Chromosome 9 (mouse)
Band	9 A3|9 8.07 cM	Start	21,926,301 bp
Band	9 A3|9 8.07 cM	End	21,963,319 bp
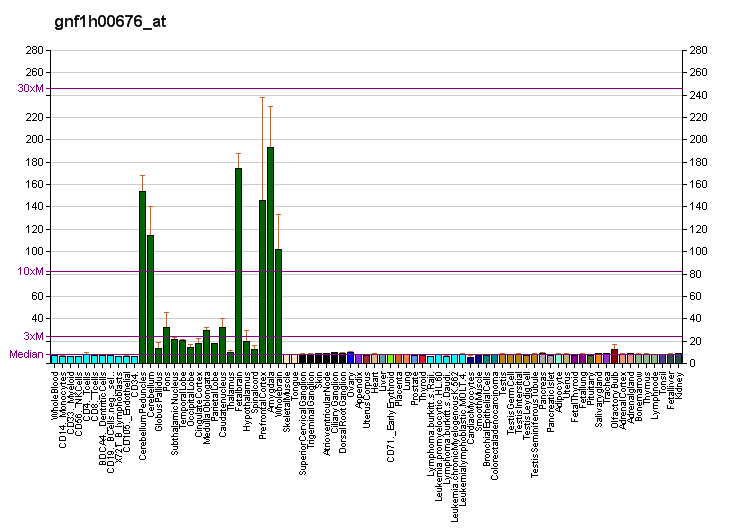

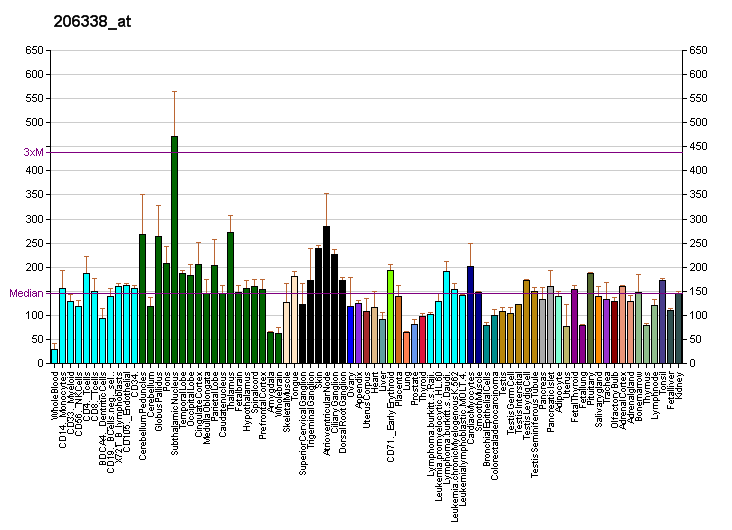
RNA expression pattern
Bgee	Human / Mouse (ortholog); Top expressed in: inferior ganglion of vagus nerve; postcentral gyrus; entorhinal cortex; ventral tegmental area; superior vestibular nucleus; ganglionic eminence; cerebellar cortex; paraflocculus of cerebellum; cerebellar vermis; pons / Top expressed in: Rostral migratory stream; cerebellar cortex; lobe of cerebellum; cerebellar vermis; habenula; superior frontal gyrus; ganglionic eminence; subiculum; pontine nuclei; medial geniculate nucleus; More reference expression data
BioGPS	More reference expression data
Orthologs
Databases	NCBI: entry; OMA: entry
Species	Human	Mouse
Entrez	1995	15571
Ensembl	ENSG00000196361	ENSMUSG00000003410
UniProt	Q14576	Q60900
RefSeq (mRNA)	NM_001420; NM_032281	NM_010487
RefSeq (protein)	NP_001411; NP_115657	NP_034617
Location (UCSC)	Chr 19: 11.45 – 11.48 Mb	Chr 9: 21.93 – 21.96 Mb
PubMed search
- Wikidata
View/Edit Human	View/Edit Mouse

ELAV-like protein 3 is a protein that in humans is encoded by the ELAVL3 gene.

A member of the ELAVL protein family, ELAV-like 3 is a neural-specific RNA-binding protein which contains three RNP-type RNA recognition motifs. The observation that ELAVL3 is one of several Hu antigens (neuronal-specific RNA-binding proteins) recognized by the anti-Hu serum antibody present in sera from patients with paraneoplastic encephalomyelitis and sensory neuronopathy (PEM/PSN) suggests it has a role in neurogenesis. Two alternatively spliced transcript variants encoding distinct isoforms have been found for this gene.
