= Critical illness polyneuropathy =

- Specialty: Neurology

Critical illness polyneuropathy (CIP) and critical illness myopathy (CIM) are overlapping syndromes of diffuse, symmetric, flaccid muscle weakness occurring in critically ill patients and involving all extremities and the diaphragm with relative sparing of the cranial nerves. CIP and CIM have similar symptoms and presentations and are often distinguished largely on the basis of specialized electrophysiologic testing or muscle and nerve biopsy. The causes of CIP and CIM are unknown, though they are thought to be a possible neurological manifestation of systemic inflammatory response syndrome. Corticosteroids and neuromuscular blocking agents, which are widely used in intensive care, may contribute to the development of CIP and CIM, as may elevations in blood sugar, which frequently occur in critically ill patients.

CIP was first described by Charles F. Bolton in a series of five patients.

Combined CIP and CIM was first described by Nicola Latronico in a series of 24 patients.

== Signs and symptoms ==
People with CIP/CIM have diffuse, symmetric, flaccid muscle weakness. CIP/CIM typically develops in the setting of a critical illness and immobilization, so patients with CIP/CIM are often receiving treatment in the intensive care unit (ICU).

Weakness (motor deficits) occurs in generalized fashion, rather than beginning in one region of the body and spreading. Limb and respiratory (diaphragm) muscles are especially affected. The muscles of the face are usually spared, but in rare cases, the eye muscles may be weakened, leading to ophthalmoplegia.

Respiratory difficulties can be caused by atrophy of the muscles between the ribs (intercostals), atrophy of the diaphragm muscle, and degeneration of the nerve that stimulates the diaphragm (phrenic nerve). This can prolong the time it takes to wean a person off of a breathing machine (mechanical ventilation) by as much as 7 – 13 days.

Deep tendon reflexes may be lost or diminished, and there may be bilateral symmetric flaccid paralysis of the arms and legs. The nervous system manifestations are typically limited to peripheral nerves, as the central nervous system is usually unaffected.

== Cause ==
The causes of CIP and CIM are unknown, though they are thought to be a possible neurological manifestation of systemic inflammatory response syndrome.

== Pathology ==
Nerve biopsy would show axonal neuropathy, but it is no longer indicated. A muscle biopsy of critical illness myopathy would show selective loss of thick filaments in muscle, demonstrating the loss of myosin and the presence of muscle cell death (necrosis). When muscles lose stimulation from neurons, they can undergo degeneration. However, when critical illness myopathy occurs, it is not solely due to loss of innervation of the muscle. With critical illness myopathy, no other cause of the muscle degeneration can be found.

Unlike Guillain–Barre syndrome, another neurological disorder that causes weakness, patients with critical illness polyneuropathy do not have loss of the myelin sheath that normally surrounds neurons (demyelination).

== Diagnosis ==
CIP and CIM are a major cause of ICU-acquired weakness (ICUAW). Current guidelines recommend a clinical diagnosis of ICUAW, made by manually testing the muscle strength with the use of the Medical Research Council (MRC) sum score or handgrip dynamometry.

CIP/CIM is often not identified until a patient is unable to be successfully weaned from a mechanical ventilator. Early detection of the condition is difficult, because these patients are often sedated and intubated, and thus unable to cooperate with a thorough neuromuscular physical examination. The use of conventional nerve conduction studies is time-consuming and requires specialized personnel; however, simplified electrophysiologic tests can be used as screening tools in the critically ill to confirm or exclude CIP/CIM. The peroneal nerve test is a validated, high-sensitivity, minimally invasive, non-volitional and quick diagnostic test which can accurately exclude CIP/CIM if the result is normal. Moreover, patients with disuse atrophy and muscle deconditioning have normal electrophysiological tests even if muscle strength is severely reduced Hence, these tests are important to define the cause of muscle weakness and can be helpful to refine the prognosis.

=== Laboratory values ===
The serum creatine phosphokinase (CPK) can be mildly elevated. While the CPK is often a good marker for damage to muscle tissue, it is not a helpful marker in CIP/CIM, because CIP/CIM is a gradual process and does not usually involve significant muscle cell death (necrosis). Also, even if necrosis is present, it may be brief and is therefore easily missed. If a lumbar puncture (spinal tap) is performed, the protein level in the cerebral spinal fluid would be normal.

== Screening ==
Initial screening for CIP/CIM may be performed using an objective scoring system for muscle strength. The Medical Research Council (MRC) score is one such tool, and sometimes used to help identify CIP/CIM patients in research studies. The MRC score involves assessing strength in 3 muscle groups in the right and left sides of both the upper and lower extremities. Each muscle tested is given a score of 0–5, giving a total possible score of 60. An MRC score less than 48 is suggestive of CIP/CIM. However, the tool requires that patients be awake and cooperative, which is often not the case. Also, the screening tool is non-specific, because it does not identify the cause a person's muscle weakness.

Once weakness is detected, the evaluation of muscle strength should be repeated several times. If the weakness persists, then a muscle biopsy, a nerve conduction study (electrophysiological studies), or both should be performed.

== Prognosis ==
CIP/CIM can lead to difficulty weaning a person from a mechanical ventilator, and is associated with increased length of stay in the ICU and increased mortality (death). It can lead to impaired rehabilitation. Since CIP/CIM can lead to decreased mobility (movement), it increases the risk of pneumonia, deep vein thrombosis, and pulmonary embolism.

Critically ill people that are in a coma can become completely paralyzed from CIP/CIM. Improvement usually occurs in weeks to months, as the innervation to the muscles are restored. About half of patients recover fully.

== Epidemiology ==
While the exact incidence is unknown, estimates range from 33 - 57 percent of patients staying in the ICU for longer than 7 days. More exact data is difficult to obtain, since variation exists in defining the condition.

The three main risk factors for CIP and CIM are sepsis and systemic inflammatory response syndrome (SIRS), and multi-organ failure. Reported rates of CIP/CIM in people with sepsis and SIRS range from 68 to 100 percent. Additional risk factors for developing CIP/CIM include: female gender, high blood sugar (hyperglycemia), low serum albumin, and immobility. A greater severity of illness increases the risk of CIP/CIM. Such risk factors include: multi-organ dysfunction, kidney failure, renal replacement therapy, duration of organ dysfunction, duration of ICU stay, and central neurologic failure.

Certain medications are associated with CIP/CIM, such as corticosteroids, neuromuscular blocking agents, vasopressors, catecholamines, and intravenous nutrition (parenteral nutrition). Research has produced inconsistent results for the impact of hypoxia, hypotension, hyperpyrexia, and increased age on the risk of CIP/CIM. The use of aminoglycosides is not an independent risk for the development of CIP/CIM.

== History ==
CIP was first described in 1984 by Charles F. Bolton in a series of five patients. The condition used to be described as "Bolton's neuropathy.". In 1996, Latronico and colleagues first described that CIP and CIM often coexist in the same patient.

== Terminology ==
A number of terms are used to describe critical illness polyneuropathy, partially because there is often neuropathy and myopathy in the same person, and nerve and muscle degeneration are difficult to distinguish from each other in this condition. Terms used for the condition include: critical illness polyneuromyopathy, critical illness neuromyopathy, and critical illness myopathy and neuropathy (CRIMYNE). Bolton's neuropathy is an older term, which is no longer used.

== See also ==
- Chronic critical illness
