= Systemic bias =

Inherent tendency of a process to support particular outcomes

Systemic bias is the inherent tendency of a process to support particular outcomes. The term generally refers to human systems such as institutions. Systemic bias is related to and overlaps conceptually with institutional bias and structural bias, and the terms are often used interchangeably.

In systemic bias institutional practices tend to exhibit a bias which leads to the preferential treatment or advantage of specific social groups, while others experience disadvantage or devaluation. This bias may not necessarily stem from intentional prejudice or discrimination but rather from the adherence to established rules and norms by the majority.

Systemic bias includes institutional, systemic, and structural bias which can lead to institutional racism, which is a type of racism that is integrated into the laws, norms, and regulations of a society or establishment. Structural bias, in turn, has been defined more specifically in reference to racial inequities as "the normalized and legitimized range of policies, practices, and attitudes that routinely produce cumulative and chronic adverse outcomes for minority populations". The issues of systemic bias are dealt with extensively in the field of industrial organization economics.

== In human institutions ==
Cognitive bias is inherent in the experiences, loyalties, and relationships of people in their daily lives, and new biases are constantly being discovered and addressed on both an ethical and political level. For example, the goal of affirmative action in the United States is to counter biases concerning gender, race, and ethnicity, by opening up institutional participation to people with a wider range of backgrounds, and hence a wider range of points of view. In India, the system of Scheduled Castes and Tribes intends to address systemic bias caused by the controversial caste system, a system centered on organized discrimination based upon one's ancestry, not unlike the system that affirmative action aims to counter. Both the scheduling system and affirmative action mandate the hiring of citizens from within designated groups. However, without sufficient restrictions based upon the actual socio-economic standing of the recipients of the aid provided, these types of systems can allegedly result in the unintentional institutionalization of a reversed form of the same systemic bias, which works against the goal of rendering institutional participation open to people with a wider range of backgrounds.

Unconscious bias training has become common in many organizations, which is theorized to address both systemic and structural bias. This training addressed the practices and policies of the organization, such as hiring practices that favor social networking, or a grooming policy that disadvantages people with Afro-textured hair.

A systemic counter bias can be observed in some cases, for example negative gender pay gap in some countries.

== Major causes ==
The study of systemic bias as part of the field titled organizational behavior in industrial organization economics is studied in several principle modalities in both non-profit and for-profit institutions. The issue of concern is that patterns of behavior may develop within large institutions which become harmful to the productivity and viability of the larger institutions from which they develop, as well as the community they occupy. The three major categories of study for maladaptive organizational behavior and systemic bias are counterproductive work behavior, human resource mistreatment, and the amelioration of stress-inducing behavior.

=== Racism ===
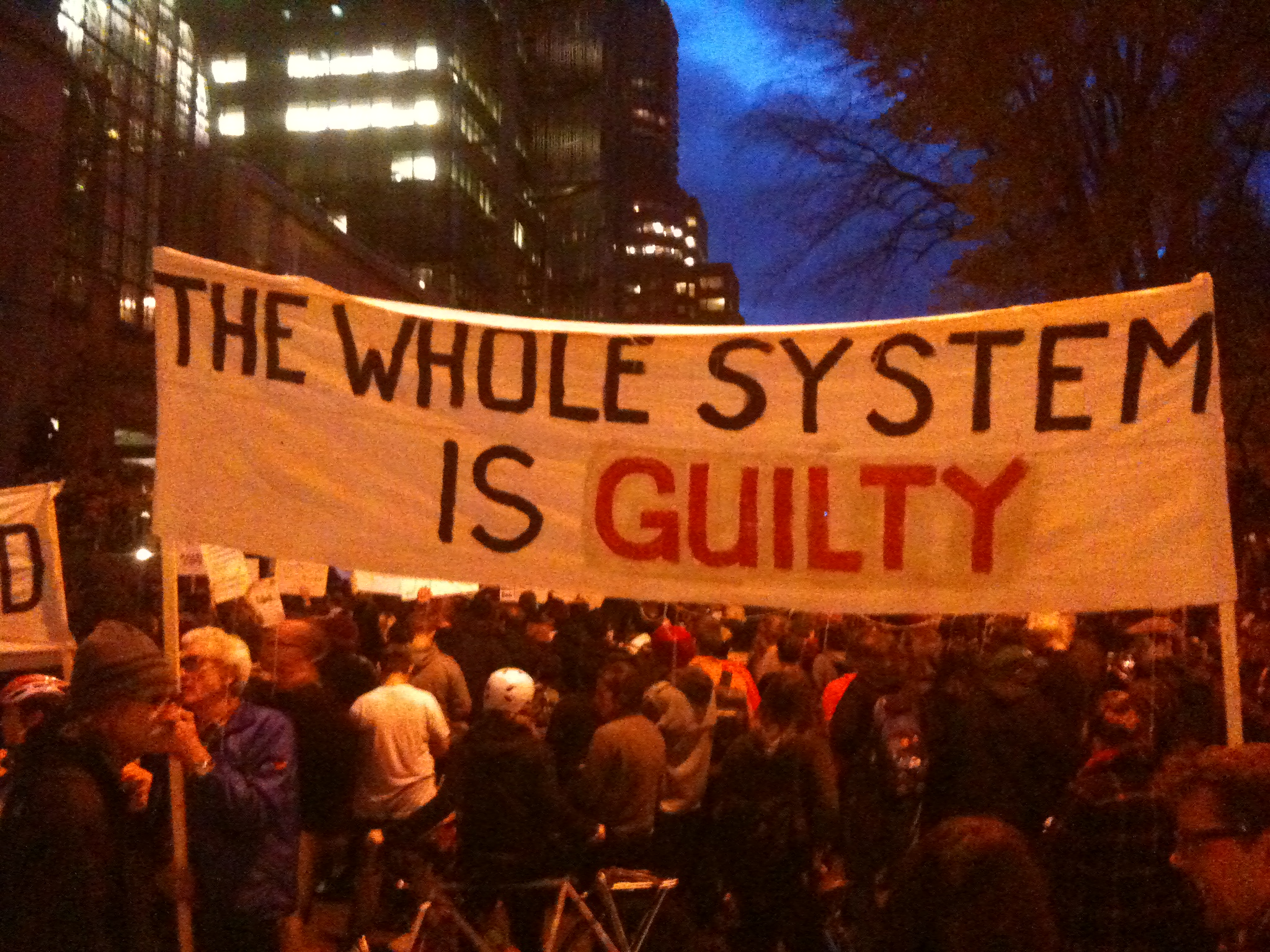
Protest in the US over systemic racism, reading "The whole system is guilty"

Racism is prejudice, discrimination or hostility towards other people because they are of a different racial or ethnic origin. Medical students conducted studies to investigate systemic biases associated with race. The result of the study showed that due to systemic bias, certain groups of people are marginalized due to race and differences, their professional careers are threatened, and more homework/responsibility is given to those in the minority group.

=== Counterproductive work behavior ===
Counterproductive work behavior consists of behavior by employees that harms or intends to harm organizations and people in organizations.

=== Mistreatment of human resources ===
There are several types of mistreatment that employees endure in organizations.

- Abusive supervision: the extent to which a supervisor engages in a pattern of behavior that harms subordinates.
- Bullying: although definitions of bullying vary, it involves a repeated pattern of harmful behaviors directed towards an individual.
- Incivility: low-intensity discourteous and rude behavior with ambiguous intent to harm that violates norms for appropriate behavior in the workplace.
- Sexual harassment: behavior that denigrates or mistreats an individual due to their gender, creates an offensive workplace, and interferes with an individual being able to do their job.
- Occupational stress: the imbalance between the demands (aspects of the job that require mental or physical effort) and resources that help cope with these demands.

== Example ==
Financial Week reported in May 2008:

But we travel in a world with a systemic bias to optimism that typically chooses to avoid the topic of the impending bursting of investment bubbles. Collectively, this is done for career or business reasons. As discussed many times in the investment business, pessimism or realism in the face of probable trouble is just plain bad for business and bad for careers. What I am only slowly realizing, though, is how similar the career risk appears to be for the Fed. It doesn't want to move against bubbles because Congress and business do not like it and show their dislike in unmistakable terms. Even Federal reserve chairmen get bullied and have their faces slapped if they stick to their guns, which will, not surprisingly, be rare since everyone values his career or does not want to be replaced à la Volcker. So, be as optimistic as possible, be nice to everyone, bail everyone out, and hope for the best. If all goes well, after all, you will have a lot of grateful bailees who will happily hire you for $300,000 a pop.

== Versus systematic bias ==
In engineering and computational mechanics, the word bias is sometimes used as a synonym of systematic error. In this case, the bias is referred to the result of a measurement or computation, rather than to the measurement instrument or computational method.

Some authors try to draw a distinction between systemic and systematic corresponding to that between unplanned and planned, or to that between arising from the characteristics of a system and from an individual flaw. In a less formal sense, systemic biases are sometimes said to arise from the nature of the interworkings of the system, whereas systematic biases stem from a concerted effort to favor certain outcomes. Consider the difference between affirmative action (systematic) compared to racism and caste (systemic).

== See also ==
- Bandwagon effect
- Disinformation
- Echo chamber (media)
- Ethnocentrism
- Framing (social sciences)
- Funding bias
- Gatekeeping (communication)
- Gender bias on Wikipedia
- Inherent bias
- Institutional racism
- Managing the news
- Media bias
- Media manipulation
- Observational error
- Prejudice
- Propaganda
- Racial bias on Wikipedia
- Spin (public relations)
- Underrepresented groups
