= Peripheral mononeuropathy =

- Specialty: Neurology

Peripheral mononeuropathy is a nerve related disease where a single nerve, that is used to transport messages from the brain to the peripheral body, is diseased or damaged. Peripheral neuropathy is a general term that indicates any disorder of the peripheral nervous system. The name of the disorder itself can be broken down in order to understand this better; peripheral: in regard to peripheral neuropathy, refers to outside of the brain and spinal cord; neuro: means nerve related; -pathy; means disease. Peripheral mononeuropathy is a disorder that links to Peripheral Neuropathy, as it only effects a single peripheral nerve rather than several damaged or diseased nerves throughout the body. Healthy peripheral nerves are able to "carry messages from the brain and spinal cord to muscles, organs, and other body tissues".

Peripheral neuropathy and mononeuropathy are common neurological disorders, with a diverse range of variables and causes to conclude a diagnosis. Neuropathy has three sub-classifications; mononeuropathy is a result of an entrapped or traumatised nerve or nerve area, Mononeuropathy multiplex is linked to chronic diseases like leprosy, and polyneuropathy is an outcome of systemic, metabolic or toxic aetiology.

== Signs and symptoms ==
The signs and symptoms of Peripheral mononeuropathy and neuropathy vary as a result of the types of individual and/or nerve areas affected. There are three types of nerve damage, including: "motor nerve damage, sensory nerve damage, and autonomic nerve damage". These sensory, motor and autonomic fibres which make up peripheral nerves have specific functions, which means that their involvement in neuropathic disorders can lead to "diverse symptoms, signs and electrodiagnostic (EDx) features", and a focus on such symptoms can be valuable in understanding and diagnosing varied cases of peripheral neuropathy and mononeuropathy.

=== Motor nerve damage ===
This is usually correlated with muscle weakness, "other symptoms include painful cramps, fasciculations (uncontrolled muscle twitching visible under the skin) and muscle shrinking". Motor symptoms can usually be aided through "mechanical aids" such as hand or foot braces, orthopaedic shoes, splints, and in more severe cases procedures such as tendon transfers or bone fusions can take place. All of these aids and procedures can reduce physical disability, pain, pressured or compressed nerves and weaknesses.

=== Sensory nerve damage ===
This is a broader category as sensory nerves have a broader function range, and therefore there are deviations in symptoms:

- "Damage to large sensory fibres harms the ability to feel vibrations and touch, especially in the hands and feet", in some cases this may cause the individual to experience a similar feeling to wearing gloves and stockings. Sensory nerve damage may aid in the decline of reflexes, furthermore the ability to coordinate complex movements may be affected. For example: walking, balance and doing or undoing zippers and buttons.
- "Small-fibre polyneuropathy can interfere with the ability to feel pain or changes in temperature". For some individuals, neuropathic pain can be more prominent at night, which makes it harder to sleep and thus rest and recovery in order to rehabilitate nerve damage can be difficult. This may be a result of spontaneous stimulation in pain receptors or difficulties with signal processing, therefore resulting in light touches that are normally experienced as painless, to cause severe pain.

In order to assist and improve in sensory nerve damage, which can be difficult to maintain without medication, some patients adopt behavioural strategies in order to manage chronic pain, along with emotional discrepancies that may follow the nerve injury (national institute of neurological disorders).

=== Autonomic nerve damage ===
This "affects the axons in small-fibre neuropathies". Excess sweating, heat intolerance, unstable blood pressure, and gastrointestinal abnormalities are all symptoms that can be linked to autonomic nerve damage. Some peripheral neuropathic and mono-neuropathic disorders that stem from autonomic nerve damage include: "diabetes... Guillain-Barre syndrome, carpal tunnel syndrome, meralgia paresthetica...[and] complex regional pain syndrome". To improve autonomic nerve damage symptoms, patients can use complementary methods as well as medical management and medication. These methods can include therapies such as acupuncture, massages, herbal medications and much more.

== Causes ==
"Mononeuropathy refers to single peripheral nerve involvement and usually occurs due to trauma, nerve compression or entrapment". Isolated situations like pregnancy, thyroid disease or ones occupation (desk work or intense physical labour) can lead to mononeuropathy as a result entrapped nerve sites. Peripheral neuropathy and mononeuropathy can be a result of a variety of factors, but are a result of one of three methods:

- Acquired neuropathies - this method of neuropathy is a result of environmental factors. Diabetes, alcoholism, poor nutrition, particular medications, cancer and/or chemotherapy, can all be classified as causes for acquired neuropathies.
- Hereditary neuropathies - these neuropathies stem from diseased genetically passed material that inherently make up the child's peripheral nervous system, such as Charcot-Marie-Tooth disease type1.
- Idiopathic neuropathies - these types of neuropathies are developed from an unknown cause.

	Causes of Peripheral Neuropathy based on clinical presentation
Conditions causing mononeuropathy	Acute (trauma related) Chronic (nerve entrapment)
Disorders causing mononeuropathy multiplex	Acute Diabetes mellitus Multifocal motor neuropathy Vasculitis syndromes Chronic Acquired immunodeficiency syndrome Leprosy Sarcoidosis
Conditions causing neuropathy with autonomic features	Alcoholism Amyloidosis Chemotherapy-related neuropathy Diabetes Heavy metal toxicity Paraneoplastic syndrome Porphyria Primary dysautonomia Vitamin B12 deficiency
Conditions causing painful neuropathy	Alcoholism Amyloidosis Chemotherapy (heavy metal toxicity) Diabetes Idiopathic polyneuropathy Porphyria

== Diagnosis ==
Due to the fact that the symptoms of peripheral mononeuropathy and neuropathy can be so diverse, means that the diagnosis of neuropathies can often be difficult and therefore require more medical testing to ensure the appropriate diagnosis. Diagnosing neuropathic disorders often includes:

- Medical history - this will include any previous diagnoses or disorders, triggers or symptoms that usually arise, and other factors such as work environment and social habits etc.
- Physical and neurological exams - the doctor will examine the patient to see if any other diseases or disorders have developed over time, and if it effects the diagnosis of a neuropathic disorder.
- Body fluid tests - blood tests are more valuable to detect things like diabetes of vitamin deficiencies, whilst other bodily fluids are not used as commonly.
- Genetic testing - used to see if any forms of neuropathy have been inherited from the patient's parents or grandparents.

== Treatment ==
Peripheral mononeuropathy can be complex in the sense that it can be diagnosed and treated in numerous ways, because of its diversity of symptoms and causes. Therefore, treating peripheral mononeuropathy depends on what nerve area is damaged and the patient's symptoms. The most general and maintainable advice for treating peripheral neuropathy and mononeuropathy would be to lead a balanced and healthy lifestyle, without good nutrition, exercise, avoiding mass exposure to toxins, balanced intake and absorption of vitamins and minerals, and reducing one's alcoholic and smoking frequency. Although, Peripheral Mononeuropathy has no scientifically reached a point where the symptoms and effects can be reversed, patients can use medications, therapies, clinical trials, alternative medicines, lifestyle changes and home remedies in order to stop, slow and prevent the occurrence of peripheral mononeuropathy symptoms. Some examples might include:

Testing:

- Blood tests
- Imaging tests
- Nerve function tests
- Other nerve function tests
- Nerve biopsy
- Skin biopsy

Medications:

- Pain relievers
- Anti-seizure medications
- Topical treatments
- Antidepressants

Therapies:

- Transcutaneous electrical nerve stimulation (TENS)
- Plasma exchange and intravenous immune globulin
- Physical therapy
- nerve decompression surgery

Alternative medicine:

- Acupuncture
- Alpha-lipoic acid
- Herbs
- Amino acids

Lifestyle and home remedies

- Take care of your feet, especially if you have diabetes
- Exercise
- Quit smoking
- Eat healthy meals
- Avoid excessive alcohol
- Monitor your blood glucose levels

== Experimental research ==
Due to its broad range of variation, researchers have been experimenting on different treatments for Peripheral Mononeuropathy through treating lab rats with preventative and post medications and treatments. Researcher Claudia Sommer et al. provided a study which experiments with "Anti-TNF-neutralizing antibodies" in order to "reduce pain-related behaviour in two different mouse models of painful mononeuropathy". TNF or Tumour necrosis factor "is a mediator of inflammatory and neuropathic pain". Through testing different variants between the set of test rats, Sommer et al concludes; "The degree of endoneurial damage and the effect of TNF-AB in the behavioural tests was identical in the two models. The anti-hyperalgesic action of TNF in nerve injury is thus independent of epineurial inflammation. This is consistent with observations by others and by us, that the increase in TNF after nerve injury is mostly due to its increased synthesis in Schwann cells. Inhibition of TNF by ABs was effective when thermal hyperalgesia was already present, and after the peak of TNF release (at 12 h) in the nerve. Mechanical thresholds, however, were only influenced by prophylactic administration of the AB. This may reflect the different fibre populations involved or the greater impact of central sensitization in mechanical allodynia. Interestingly, mice deficient of TNF receptor 1 develop mechanical allodynia after CCI (Chronic Constrictive Injury) but not thermal hyperalgesia, indicating a greater influence of endogenous TNF on thermal than on mechanical thresholds".

Another study by Jianren Mao et al. examined how "intrathecal treatment with dextrorphan or ketamine potently reduces pain-related behaviours in a rat model of peripheral mononeuropathy". Mao understands that "the experimental neuropathic pain syndrome seen in CCI rats is similar in many respects to the neuropathic pain syndrome seen in man". Mao et al. concludes that "Mechanisms of dextrorphan and ketamine induced attenuation of nociceptive behaviours in CCI rats are likely to be related to their effects on NMDA (N-methyl-D-aspartate) receptor-mediated central nervous system excitability that may occur following peripheral nerve injury. Both dextrorphan and ketamine are non-competitive NMDA receptor antagonists and have shown to reduce excitatory amino acid-mediated neurotoxicity. Since CCI produces central nervous system hyperexcitability that is mediated by spinal cord NMDA and non-NMDA receptor activation and subsequent intracellular processes, the therapeutic effects of dextrorphan and ketamine on neuropathic pain behaviours may be related to their ability to reduce spinal cord NMDA receptor activation following either multiple or single treatment of these compounds. Since peripheral anaesthesia of the injured sciatic nerve after the development of pain-related behaviours was also found to attenuate thermal hyperalgesia in CCI rats, dextrorphan or ketamine treatment, alone or in combination with local nerve anaesthesia, may prove to be a useful therapeutic means for clinical management of neuropathic pain syndromes".

The third research experiment that will be presented on this article is Patrick M. Dougherty's (et al.) commentary on "differential influence of local anaesthetic upon two models of experimentally induced peripheral mononeuropathy in the rat". Dougherty exposes that two types of peripheral mononeuropathies, which have been discovered amongst lab rats, can resemble if not correlate with peripheral mononeuropathy experiences in humans. Through Dougherty's experimentation process he used behavioural testing, surgical procedures and statistical analysis, in order to come to diagnoses of Partial constriction neuropathy (PCN), Partial transection neuropathy (PTN), and the comparisons between the two: "PCN and PTN models appear to differ in at least two ways. First, the PCN has a more rapid onset and attains a greater magnitude of hyperalgesia than does the PTN. Second, the PCN shows a sensitivity to application of local anaesthetic upon the nerve at the time of injury, which is not evident in the PTN model". Dougherty ends the study with the conclusion that "Behavioural testing demonstrates several differences between these two models and our data suggests that early mechanism(s) underlying the two models are also different. The data suggest that injury-related discharge is one important factor contributing to the generation of hyperalgesia in the PCN model. The mechanism(s) responsible for the generation of hyperalgesia in the early stages on the PTN model are not lidocainesensitive. Further experimentation is needed to determine what these early mechanisms are and how they might be manipulated".
