= Inherent bias =

Inherent bias is the effect of underlying factors or assumptions that skew viewpoints of a subject under discussion. There are multiple formal definitions of "inherent bias" which depend on the particular field of study.

In statistics, the phrase is used in relation to an inability to measure accurately and directly what one would wish to measure, meaning that indirect measurements are used which might be subject to unknown distortions.

== See also ==
- Systemic bias and systematic bias, or cognitive bias
- Tacit assumption, paradigm shift
- Hawthorne effect
