= Mount Bolton =

Mountain in the country of Canada

- Location within Alberta Location within British Columbia Location within Canada

Highest point
- Elevation: 2,706 m (8,878 ft)
- Prominence: 395 m (1,296 ft)
- Parent peak: Mount Cornwell (2972 m)
- Listing: Mountains of Alberta; Mountains of British Columbia
- Coordinates: 50°19′48″N 114°48′04″W

Geography
- Country: Canada
- Provinces: Alberta and British Columbia
- Parent range: High Rock Range
- Topo map: NTS 82J7 Mount Head

Mount Bolton is located on the border of Alberta and British Columbia on the Continental Divide, northeast of Elkford, Kootenay Land District. It was named after Bolton, Lambert Ernest Stanley DLS. Bolton was serving with the Canadian Pioneers, 1st Battilion when he was killed in action on June 13, 1916.

== See also ==
- List of peaks on the British Columbia–Alberta border
