= Polyneuropathy =

Any disease affecting peripheral nerves on both sides of the body

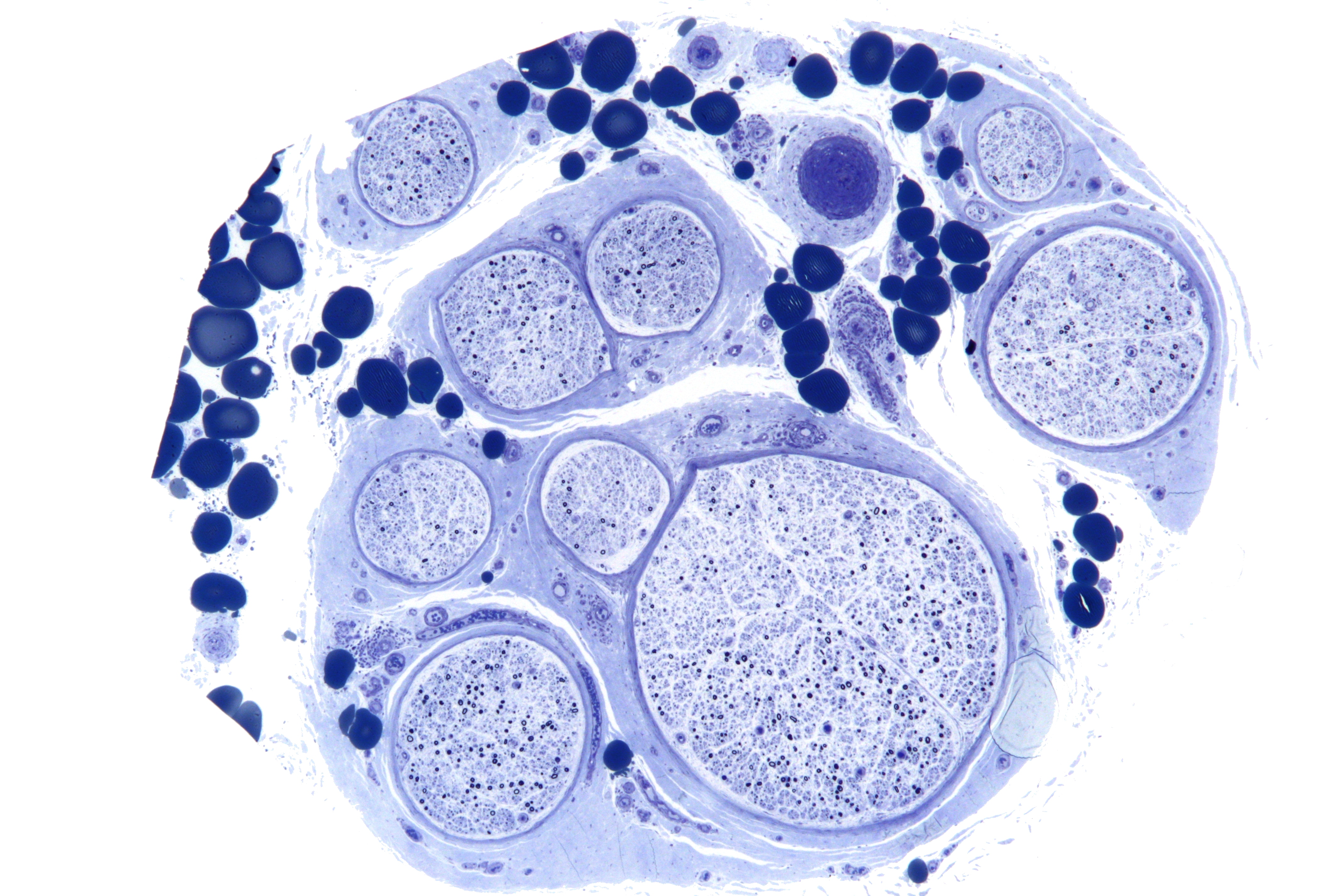
- Micrograph showing peripheral neuropathy (vasculitis). Polyneuropathy is peripheral neuropathy occurring in the same areas on both sides of the body.
- Specialty: Neurology
- Symptoms: Ataxia
- Causes: Hereditary (Charcot–Marie–Tooth disease), and acquired (alcohol use disorder)
- Diagnostic method: Nerve conduction study, urinalysis
- Treatment: Occupational therapy, weight decrease (management)

Polyneuropathy (from Greek poly- 'many', neuro- 'nerve' and -pathy 'sickness') is damage or disease affecting peripheral nerves (peripheral neuropathy) in roughly the same areas on both sides of the body, featuring weakness, numbness, and burning pain. It usually begins in the hands and feet and may progress to the arms and legs and sometimes to other parts of the body where it may affect the autonomic nervous system. It may be acute or chronic. A number of different disorders may cause polyneuropathy, including diabetes and some types of Guillain–Barré syndrome.

== Classification ==
Polyneuropathies may be classified in different ways, such as by cause, by presentation, or by classes of polyneuropathy, in terms of which part of the nerve cell is affected mainly: the axon, the myelin sheath, or the cell body.

Action potential propagation in myelinated neurons is faster than in unmyelinated neurons (left)

- Distal axonopathy, is the result of interrupted function of the peripheral nerves. It is the most common response of neurons to metabolic or toxic disturbances, and may be caused by metabolic diseases such as diabetes, kidney failure, connective tissue disease, deficiency syndromes such as malnutrition and alcoholism, or the effects of toxins or drugs such as chemotherapy. They may be divided according to the type of axon affected (large-fiber, small-fiber, or both). The most distal portions of axons are usually the first to degenerate, and axonal atrophy advances slowly toward the nerve's cell body. However, if the cause is removed, then regeneration is possible, although the prognosis depends on the duration and severity of the original stimulus. People with distal axonopathies usually present with sensorimotor disturbances such as amyotrophic lateral sclerosis.
- Myelinopathy, is due to a loss of myelin or of the Schwann cells. This demyelination slows down or completely blocks the conduction of action potentials through the axon of the nerve cell (neurapraxia). The most common cause is acute inflammatory demyelinating polyneuropathy AIDP, the most common form of Guillain–Barré syndrome (although other causes include chronic inflammatory demyelinating polyneuropathy).
- Neuronopathy is the result of issues in the peripheral nervous system (PNS) neurons. They may be caused by motor neurone diseases, sensory neuronopathies, toxins, or autonomic dysfunction. Neurotoxins such as chemotherapy agents may cause neuronopathies.

== Signs and symptoms ==
Among the signs and symptoms of polyneuropathy, which can be divided (into sensory and hereditary) and are consistent with the following, are:

- Sensory polyneuropathy – ataxia, numbness, muscle wasting and paraesthesiae.
- Hereditary polyneuropathy – scoliosis and hammer toes

== Causes ==
The causes of polyneuropathy can be divided into hereditary and acquired and are therefore as follows:

- Inherited – hereditary motor neuropathies, Charcot–Marie–Tooth disease, and hereditary neuropathy with liability to pressure palsy
- Acquired – diabetes mellitus, vascular neuropathy, alcohol use disorder, vitamin E deficiency, and vitamin B12 deficiency

== Pathophysiology ==
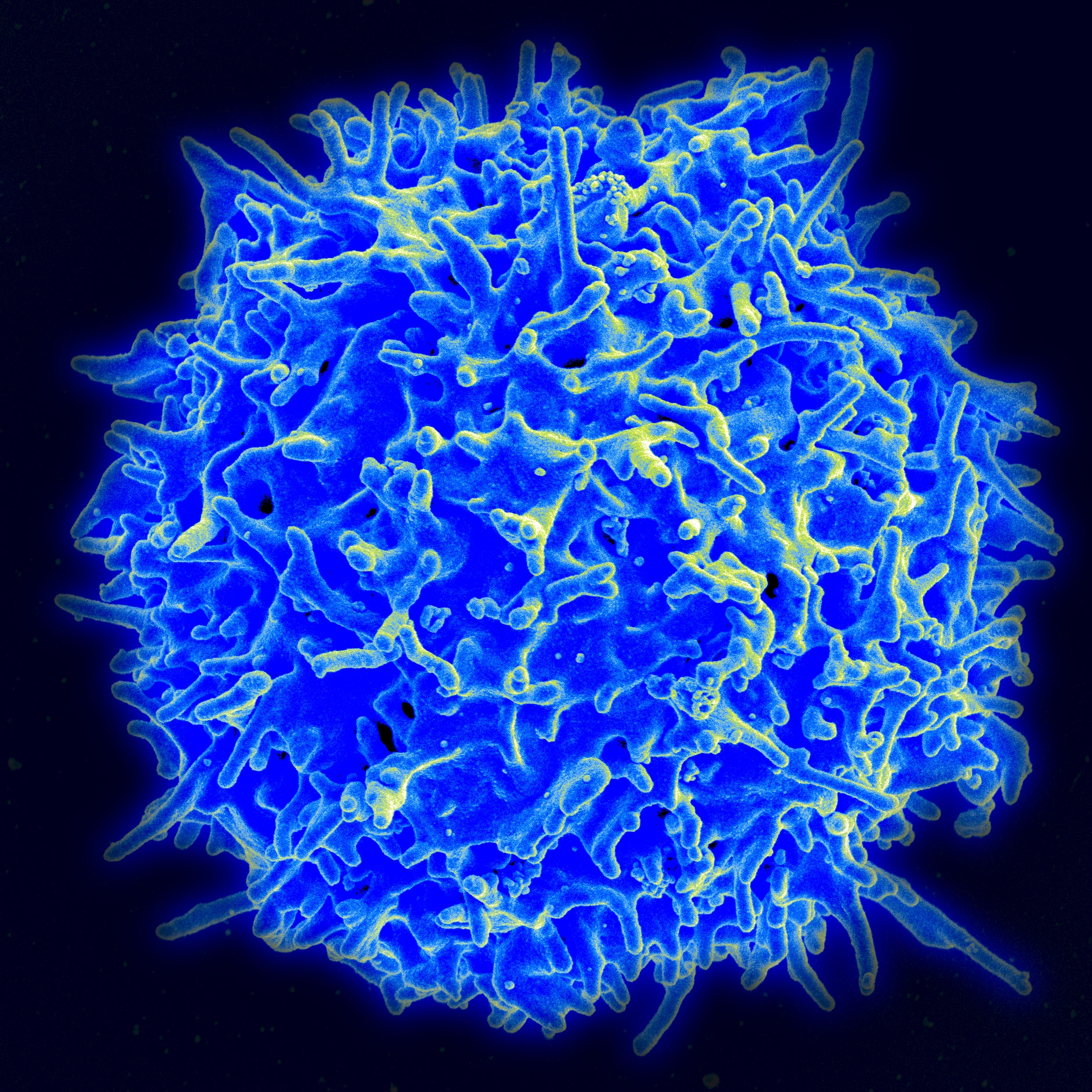
Human T Cell

The pathophysiology of polyneuropathy depends on the type. Chronic inflammatory demyelinating polyneuropathy, for instance, is an autoimmune disease: T cells involvement has been demonstrated, antibodies alone are not capable of demyelination.

== Diagnosis ==
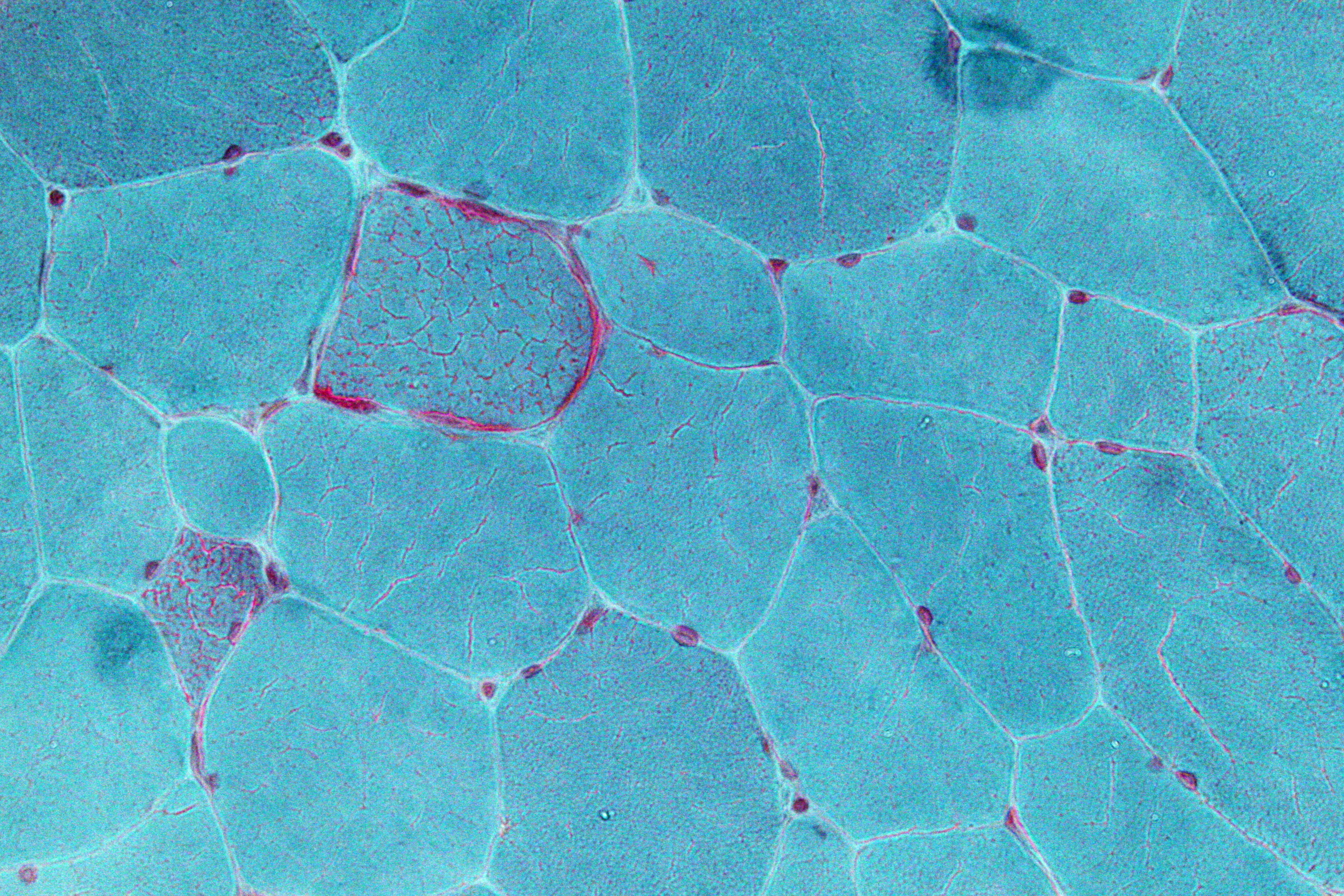
Micrograph of a muscle biopsy

The diagnosis of polyneuropathy begins with a history (anamnesis) and physical examination to ascertain the pattern of the disease process (such as arms, legs, distal, proximal), if they fluctuate, and what deficits and pain are involved. If pain is a factor, determining where and how long it has been present is important; one also needs to know what disorders are present within the family and what diseases the person may have. Although diseases often are suggested by the physical examination and history alone, tests that may be employed include electrodiagnostic testing, serum protein electrophoresis, nerve conduction studies, urinalysis, serum creatine kinase (CK) and antibody testing; nerve biopsy is done sometimes. Other tests may be used, especially tests for specific disorders associated with polyneuropathies; quality measures have been developed to diagnose patients with distal symmetrical polyneuropathy (DSP).

=== Differential diagnosis ===
In terms of the differential diagnosis for polyneuropathy, the following must be considered:

- Vitamin deficiency
- Diabetes mellitus
- Toxins
- Guillain–Barré syndrome
- Lyme disease
- Hepatitis C
- Amyloidosis
- Acromegaly
- Kidney failure
- Friedreich's Ataxia

== Treatment ==
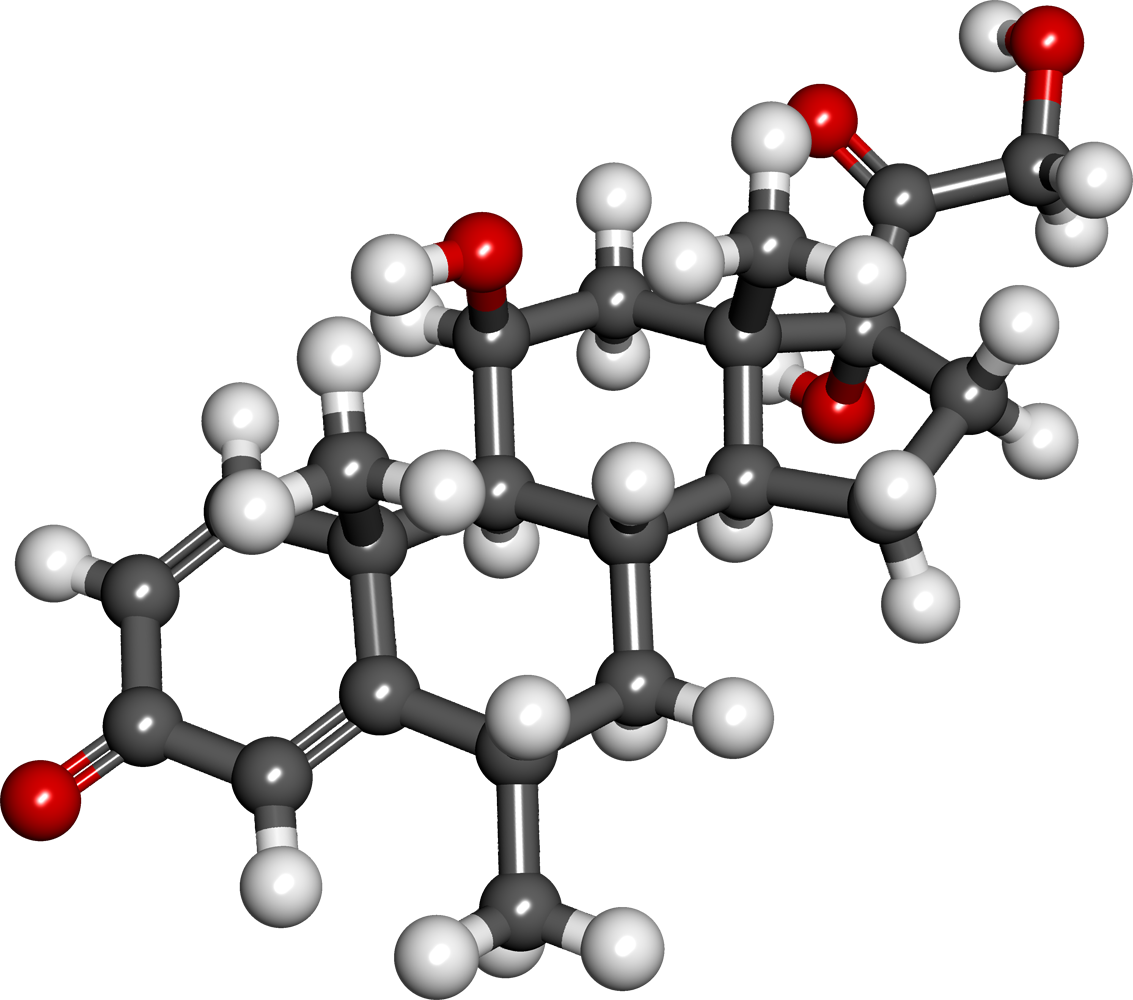
Methylprednisolone

In the treatment of polyneuropathies one must ascertain and manage the cause, among management activities are: weight decrease, use of a walking aid, and occupational therapist assistance. Additionally, BP control in those with diabetes is helpful, while intravenous immunoglobulin is used for multifocal motor neuropathy.

According to Lopate, et al., methylprednisolone is a viable treatment for chronic inflammatory demyelinative polyneuropathy (which can also be treated with intravenous immunoglobulin). The authors also indicate that prednisone has greater adverse effects in such treatment, as opposed to intermittent (high-doses) of the aforementioned medication.

According to Wu, et al., in critical illness polyneuropathy supportive and preventive therapy are important for the affected individual, as well as, avoiding (or limiting) corticosteroids.

== See also ==
- Hereditary neuropathy with liability to pressure palsy
- Mononeuropathy
- Neuritis
- Neuromuscular disease
- Neuromuscular medicine
- Neuropathy
- Polyradiculoneuropathy
- Radial neuropathy
