= Intensive care medicine =

Medical care subspecialty, treating critically ill

Intensive care medicine Critical care medicine
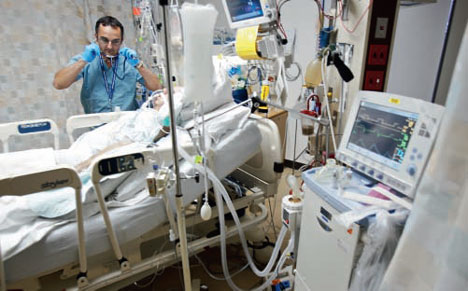
- A patient being managed in an intensive care unit
- Focus: Organ dysfunction, life support
- Significant diseases: Respiratory failure, Organ failure, Multiorgan failure, Shock
- Specialist: Intensive care physician Critical care physician Intensivist

Intensive care physician Critical care physician Intensivist
Occupation
- Occupation type: Specialty
- Activity sectors: Medicine

Description
- Education required: Doctor of Medicine (MD); Doctor of Osteopathic Medicine (DO); Bachelor of Medicine, Bachelor of Surgery (MBBS, MBCHB, et al.)
- Fields of employment: Hospitals, Clinics
- Related jobs: Anesthesiologist, emergency medicine physician

Intensive care medicine, usually called critical care medicine, is a medical specialty that deals with seriously or critically ill patients who have, are at risk of, or are recovering from conditions that may be life-threatening. It includes providing life support, invasive monitoring techniques, resuscitation, and end-of-life care. Doctors in this specialty are often called intensive care physicians, critical care physicians, or intensivists.

Intensive care relies on multidisciplinary teams composed of many different health professionals. Such teams often include doctors, nurses, physical therapists, respiratory therapists, and pharmacists, among others. They usually work together in intensive care units (ICUs) within a hospital.

== Scope ==
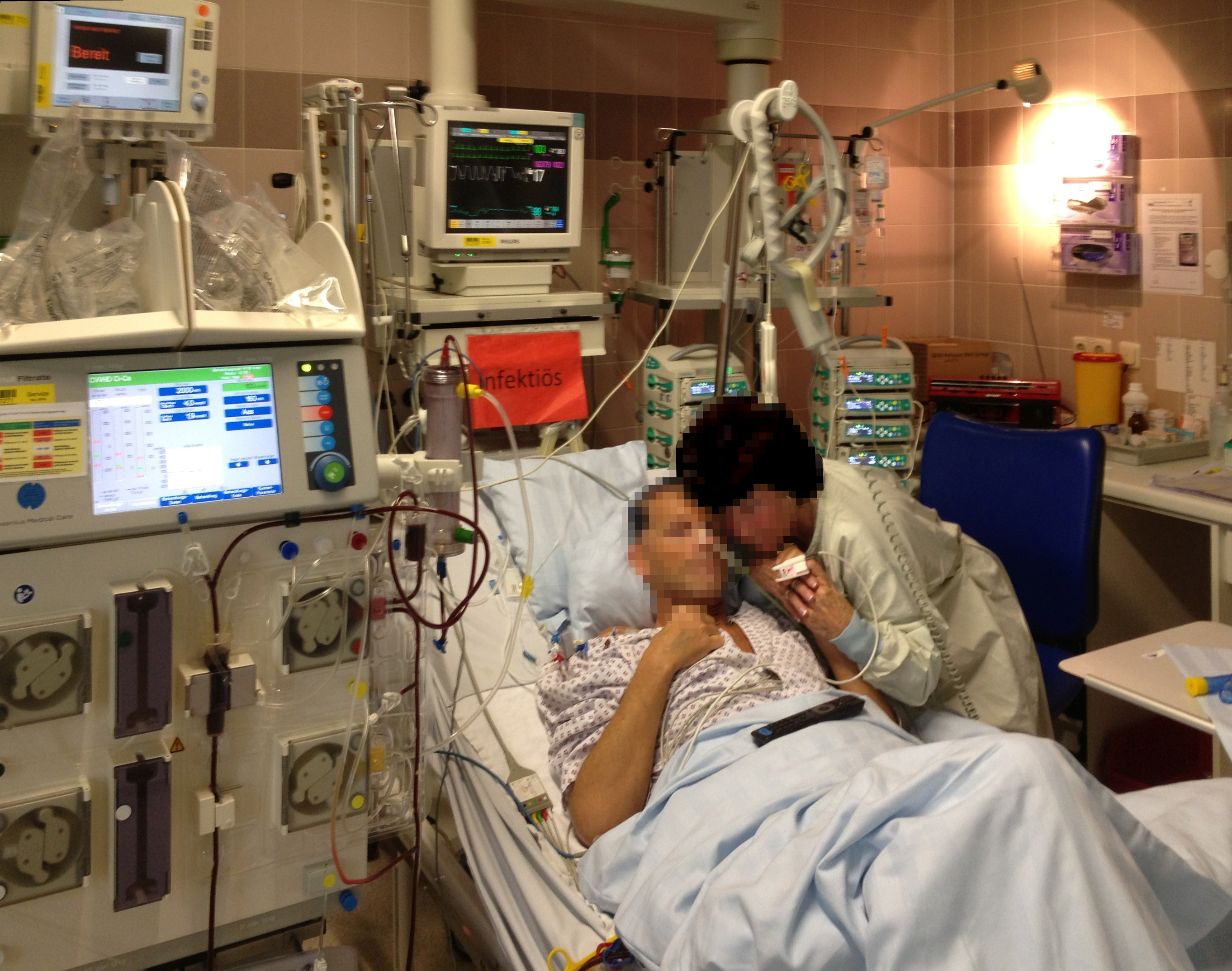
A patient in an intensive care unit in a German hospital in 2015, with two banks of infusion pumps on the right behind him, monitoring screens for heart rate, blood pressure and an electrocardiogram (top) and a portable hemodialysis machine (left)

Patients are admitted to the intensive care unit if their medical needs are greater than what the general hospital ward can provide. Indications for the ICU include: blood pressure support for cardiovascular instability (hypertension/hypotension), sepsis, post-cardiac arrest syndrome, certain cardiac arrhythmias, airway or ventilator support due to respiratory compromise, the cumulative effects of multiple organ failure (more commonly referred to as multiple organ dysfunction syndrome), or close monitoring or intensive needs following a major surgery.

There are two common ICU structures: closed and open. In a closed unit, the intensivist takes on the primary role for all patients in the unit. In an open ICU, the primary physician, who may or may not be an intensivist, can differ for each patient. There is increasingly strong evidence that closed units provide better patient outcomes. Patient management in intensive care differs between countries. Open units are the most common structure in the United States, but closed units are often found at large academic centers. Intermediate structures that fall between open and closed units also exist.

=== Types of intensive care units ===
Intensive care is usually provided in a specialized unit of a hospital called the intensive care unit (ICU) or critical care unit (CCU). Many hospitals also have designated intensive care areas for certain specialities of medicine. The naming is not rigidly standardized, and types of units are dictated by the needs and available resources of each hospital. These include:

- coronary intensive care unit (CCU or sometimes CICU) for heart disease
- medical intensive care unit (MICU)
- surgical intensive care unit (SICU)
- pediatric intensive care unit (PICU)
- pediatric cardiac intensive care unit (PCICU)
- neuroscience critical care unit (NCCU)
- overnight intensive-recovery (OIR)
- shock/trauma intensive-care unit (STICU)
- neonatal intensive care unit (NICU)
- ICU in the emergency department (E-ICU)

Medical studies suggest a positive correlation between ICU volume and quality of care for mechanically ventilated patients. After adjustment for severity of illness, demographic variables, and characteristics of the ICUs (including staffing by intensivists), higher ICU volume was significantly associated with lower ICU and hospital mortality rates. For example, adjusted ICU mortality (for a patient at average predicted risk for ICU death) was 21.2% in hospitals with 87 to 150 mechanically ventilated patients annually, and 14.5% in hospitals with 401 to 617 mechanically ventilated patients annually. Hospitals with intermediate numbers of patients had outcomes between these extremes. ICU delirium, formerly and inaccurately referred to as ICU psychosis, is a syndrome common in intensive care and cardiac units where patients who are in unfamiliar, monotonous surroundings develop symptoms of delirium (Maxmen & Ward, 1995). This may include interpreting machine noises as human voices, seeing walls quiver, or hallucinating that someone is tapping them on the shoulder. A systematic review found that sleep promotion interventions led to improved outcomes for the overall health of patients in the ICU.

== History ==
The English nurse Florence Nightingale pioneered efforts to use a separate hospital area for critically injured patients. During the Crimean War in the 1850s, she introduced the practice of moving the sickest patients to the beds directly opposite the nursing station on each ward so that they could be monitored more closely. In 1923, the American neurosurgeon Walter Dandy created a three-bed unit at the Johns Hopkins Hospital. In these units, specially trained nurses cared for critically ill postoperative neurosurgical patients.

The Danish anaesthesiologist Bjørn Aage Ibsen became involved in the 1952 poliomyelitis epidemic in Copenhagen, where 2722 patients developed the illness in a six-month period, with 316 of those developing some form of respiratory or airway paralysis. Some of these patients had been treated using the few available negative pressure ventilators, but these devices (while helpful) were limited in number and did not protect the patient's lungs from aspiration of secretions. Ibsen changed the management directly by instituting long-term positive pressure ventilation using tracheal intubation, and he enlisted 200 medical students to manually pump oxygen and air into the patients' lungs around the clock. At this time, Carl-Gunnar Engström had developed one of the first artificial positive-pressure volume-controlled ventilators, which eventually replaced the medical students. With the change in care, mortality during the epidemic declined from 90% to around 25%. Patients were managed in three special 35-bed areas, which aided charting medications and other management.

In 1953, Ibsen set up what became the world's first intensive care unit in a converted student nurse classroom in Copenhagen Municipal Hospital. He provided one of the first accounts of the management of tetanus using neuromuscular-blocking drugs and controlled ventilation. The following year, Ibsen was elected head of the department of anaesthesiology at that institution. He jointly authored the first known account of intensive care management principles in the journal Nordisk Medicin, with Tone Dahl Kvittingen from Norway.

For a time in the early 1960s, it was not clear that specialized intensive care units were needed, so intensive care resources were brought to the room of the patient that needed the additional monitoring, care, and resources. It became rapidly evident, however, that a fixed location where intensive care resources and dedicated personnel were available provided better care than ad hoc provision of intensive care services spread throughout a hospital. In 1962, in the University of Pittsburgh, the first critical care residency was established in the United States. In 1970, the Society of Critical Care Medicine was formed.

== Monitoring ==
Monitoring refers to various tools and technologies used to obtain information about a patient's condition. These can include tests to evaluate blood flow and gas exchange in the body, or to assess the function of organs such as the heart and lungs. Broadly, there are two common types of monitoring in the ICU: noninvasive and invasive.

=== Noninvasive monitoring ===
Noninvasive monitoring does not require puncturing the skin and usually does not cause pain. These tools are more inexpensive, easier to perform, and faster to result.

- Vital signs which include heart rate, blood pressure, breathing rate, body temperature
- Capnography to confirm correct position of an endotracheal tube and estimate adequacy of ventilation in mechanically ventilated patients
- Echocardiogram to evaluate the function and structure of the heart
- Electroencephalography (EEG) to assess electrical activity of the brain
- Electrocardiogram to monitor the heart's rhythm and detect changes or abnormalities in its electrical activity caused medical problems such as electrolyte disturbances and inadequate coronary blood flow
- Pulse oximetry for monitoring oxygen levels in the blood
- Thoracic electric bioimpedance (TEB) cardiography to monitor fluid status and heart function
- Ultrasound to evaluate internal structures including the heart, lungs, gallbladder, liver, kidneys, bladder, and blood vessels

=== Invasive monitoring ===
Invasive monitoring generally provides more accurate measurements, but these tests may require blood draws, puncturing the skin, and can be painful or uncomfortable.

- Arterial line to directly monitor blood pressure and obtain arterial blood gas measurements
- Blood draws or venipucture to monitor various blood components as well as administer therapeutic treatments
- Intracranial pressure monitoring to assess pressures inside the skull and on the brain
- Intravesicular manometry (bladder pressure) measurements to assess for intra-abdominal pressure
- Central line and peripherally inserted central catheter (PICC) lines for drug infusions, fluids or total parenteral nutrition
- Bronchoscopy to look at lungs and airways and sample fluid within the lungs
- Pulmonary artery catheter to monitor the function of the heart, blood volume, and tissue oxygenation

== Procedures and treatments ==
Intensive care usually takes a system-by-system approach to treatment. In alphabetical order, the key systems considered in the intensive care setting are: airway management and anaesthesia, cardiovascular system, central nervous system, endocrine system, gastro-intestinal tract (and nutritional condition), hematology, integumentary system, microbiology (including sepsis status), renal (and metabolic), and respiratory system.

=== Airway management and anaesthesia ===
- Bag valve mask ventilation and laryngoscopy
- Induction and maintenance of anaesthesia and sedation including rapid sequence induction for endotracheal intubation to facilitate mechanical ventilation.

=== Cardiovascular ===
- Point of care echocardiography
- Central venous and arterial catherisation
- Temporary cardiac pacing catheters for atrial, ventricular, or dual-chamber pacing
- Intra-aortic balloon pumping to stabilize patients with cardiogenic shock
- Ventricular assist device to aid in the function of the left ventricle, commonly in patients with advanced heart failure
- Extracorporeal membranous oxygenation

=== Gastro-intestinal tract ===
- Feeding tube for artificial nutrition
- Nasogastric intubation can be used to deliver artificial nutrition, but can also be used to remove stomach and intestinal contents
- Peritoneal aspiration and lavage to sample fluid in the abdominal cavity

=== Renal ===
- Hemofiltration for acute kidney injury

=== Respiratory ===
- Mechanical ventilation to assist breathing and oxygenation through an endotracheal tube, tracheotomy (invasive) or mask, helmet (non-invasive).
- Thoracentesis or tube thoracostomy to remove fluid or air in the pleural cavity
- Percutaneous dilatational tracheostomy insertion and ongoing management.
- Bronchoscopy including lavage.

=== Drugs ===
A wide array of drugs including but not limited to: inotropes such as Norepinephrine, sedatives such as Propofol, analgesics such as Fentanyl, neuromuscular blocking agents such as Rocuronium and Cisatracurium as well as broad spectrum antibiotics.

=== Physiotherapy and mobilization ===
Interventions such as early mobilization or exercises to improve muscle strength are sometimes suggested.

== Common complications in the ICU ==
Intensive care units are associated with increased risk of various complications that may lengthen a patient's hospitalization. Common complications in the ICU include:

- Acute renal failure
- Catheter-associated bloodstream infection
- Catheter-associated urinary tract infection
- Delirium
- Gastrointestinal bleeding
- Pressure ulcer
- Venous thromboembolism
- Ventilator-associated pneumonia
- Ventilator-induced barotrauma
- Death

== Training ==
ICU care requires more specialized patient care; this need has led to the use of a multidisciplinary team to provide care for patients. Staffing between Intensive care units by country, hospital, unit, or institution.

=== Medicine ===
Critical care medicine is an increasingly important medical specialty. Physicians with training in critical care medicine are referred to as intensivists.

Most medical research has demonstrated that ICU care provided by intensivists produces better outcomes and more cost-effective care. This has led the Leapfrog Group to make a primary recommendation that all ICU patients be managed or co-managed by a dedicated intensivist who is exclusively responsible for patients in one ICU.

==== In Australia ====
In Australia, training in intensive care medicine is through the College of Intensive Care Medicine.

==== In Germany ====
In Germany, the German Society of Anaesthesiology and Intensive Care Medicine is a medical association of professionals in the anesthetics and intensive care fields. It was established in 1955 by members of the German Society of Surgery.

==== In the United Kingdom ====
In the UK, doctors can only enter intensive care medicine training after completing two foundation years and core training in either emergency medicine, anaesthetics, acute medicine or core medicine. Most trainees dual train with one of these specialties; however, it has recently become possible to train purely in intensive care medicine. It has also possible to train in sub-specialties of intensive care medicine including pre-hospital emergency medicine.

==== In the United States ====
In the United States, the specialty requires additional fellowship training for physicians having completed their primary residency training in internal medicine, pediatrics, anesthesiology, surgery or emergency medicine. US board certification in critical care medicine is available through all five specialty boards. Intensivists with a primary training in internal medicine sometimes pursue combined fellowship training in another subspecialty such as pulmonology, cardiology, infectious disease, or nephrology. The American Society of Critical Care Medicine is a well-established multi professional society for practitioners working in the ICU including nurses, respiratory therapists, and physicians.

Intensive care physicians have some of the highest percentages of physician burnout among all medical specialties, at 48 percent.

==== In South Africa ====
Intensive care training is provided as a fellowship and is awarded as a Sub-Specialty certificate of Critical Care (Cert. Critical Care) which is awarded by the Colleges of Medicine of South Africa. Candidates are eligible to enter sub specialty training after completing specialty training in Anaesthetics, Surgery, Internal Medicine, Obstetrics and Gynaecology, Paediatrics, Cardiothoracic surgery or Neurosurgery.

Training usually takes place over 2 years during which time candidates rotate through different ICU's (Medical, Surgical, Paediatric etc.)

==== In India ====
Intensive care medicine (ICM) in India is a rapidly evolving field, responding to the increasing demand for specialized care in critical settings. Training in ICM is offered through various recognized programs that equip healthcare professionals with the necessary skills to manage critically ill patients.

Training Programs

1. DM (Doctor of Medicine):
  - A three-year postgraduate degree focusing on critical care management, typically pursued by candidates from internal medicine, anesthesia, or pediatrics.
2. DrNB (Doctorate of National Board):
  - A three-year program recognized by the National Board of Examinations (NBE) that provides specialized training in critical care. The DrNB has replaced the FNB as the primary pathway for intensivist training in India.
3. FNB (Fellowship of National Board):
  - Previously a one- to two-year fellowship aimed at those who had completed a postgraduate degree in related fields. It offered advanced training in critical care, focusing on protocols, advanced life support, and practical experience in critical care units. The FNB has been phased out following the introduction of the DrNB program.
4. IDCCM (Indian Diploma in Critical Care Medicine):
  - A one-year diploma program designed for doctors seeking foundational knowledge in critical care. It is accessible to a broader audience, including those from emergency medicine.
5. IFCCM (Indian Fellowship in Critical Care Medicine):
  - An advanced one-year fellowship for residency graduates, focusing on comprehensive critical care practices.
6. CTCCM (Certificate Course in Critical Care Medicine):
  - A shorter certificate program providing essential training in critical care concepts, suitable for professionals looking to enhance their expertise.

Feeder Specialties

The feeder specialties for intensive care medicine in India include:

- Anesthesia: Provides expertise in airway management, sedation, and perioperative care.
- Pulmonology: Offers specialized knowledge in respiratory management and ventilatory support.
- Internal Medicine: Contributes a broad understanding of systemic diseases and comprehensive patient management.
- Emergency Medicine: Focuses on acute care and stabilization of critically ill patients, essential for ICM.

=== Nursing ===
Nurses that work in the critical care setting are typically registered nurses. Nurses may pursue additional education and training in critical care medicine leading to certification as a CCRN by the American Association of Critical Care Nurses a standard that was begun in 1975. These certifications became more specialized to the patient population in 1997 by the American Association of Critical care Nurses, to include pediatrics, neonatal and adult.

=== Nurse practitioners and physician assistants ===
Nurse practitioners and physician assistants are other types of non-physician providers that care for patients in ICUs. These providers have fewer years of in-school training, typically receive further clinical on the job education, and work as part of the team under the supervision of physicians.

=== Pharmacists ===
Critical care pharmacists work with the medical team in many aspects. Some ways include monitoring serum concentrations of medication, past and current medication use, and medication allergies. They typically round with the team, but it may differ by institution. Some pharmacist, after attaining their doctorate or pharmacy, may pursue additional training in a postgraduate residency and become certified as critical care pharmacists. Pharmacists help manage all aspects of drug therapy and may pursue additional credentialing in critical care medicine as BCCCP by the Board of Pharmaceutical Specialties. Many critical care pharmacists are a part of the multi-professional Society of Critical Care Medicine. Inclusion of pharmacist decreases drug reactions and poor outcomes for patients.

=== Registered dietitians ===
Nutrition in intensive care units presents unique challenges due to changes in patient metabolism and physiology while critically ill. Critical care nutrition is rapidly becoming a subspecialty for dieticians who can pursue additional training and achieve certification in enteral and parenteral nutrition through the American Society for Parenteral and Enteral Nutrition (ASPEN).

=== Respiratory therapists ===
Respiratory therapists often work in intensive care units to monitor how well a patient is breathing. Respiratory therapists may pursue additional education and training leading to credentialing in adult critical care (ACCS) and neonatal and pediatric (NPS) specialties. Respiratory therapists have been trained to monitor a patient's breathing, provide treatments to help their breathing, evaluate for respiratory improvement, and manage mechanical ventilation parameters. They may be involved in emergency care like inserting and managing an airway, humidification of oxygen, administering diagnostic lung mechanics tests, invasive or non-invasive mechanical ventilation management, weaning the ventilator, aerosol therapy (pulmonary vasodilatory medications included), inhaled Nitric oxide therapy, arterial blood gas analysis, and providing physiotherapy. Additionally, Respiratory Therapists are commonly involved in ECMO management and many pursue certification in such therapies due to the intimate relationship of the heart and lungs. On-going critical care management of an ECMO patient commonly requires strict ventilator management in relation to the type of ECMO support used.

== Economics ==
In general, it is the most expensive, technologically advanced and resource-intensive area of medical care. In the United States, estimates of the 2000 expenditure for critical care medicine ranged from US$19–55 billion. During that year, critical care medicine accounted for 0.56% of GDP, 4.2% of national health expenditure and about 13% of hospital costs. In 2011, hospital stays with ICU services accounted for just over one-quarter of all discharges (29.9%) but nearly one-half of aggregate total hospital charges (47.5%) in the United States. The mean hospital charge was 2.5 times higher for discharges with ICU services than for those without.

== See also ==
- Mechanical ventilation
- Extracorporeal membrane oxygenation
- Telemetry
- Chronic critical illness
- Critical care nursing
