= Marc R. Nuwer =

American neurologist

Marc R. Nuwer is an American neurologist, clinical neurophysiologist, and academic physician. He is a Distinguished Professor of Neurology and Neurosurgery at the David Geffen School of Medicine at the University of California, Los Angeles (UCLA), where he also served as head of clinical neurophysiology at Ronald Reagan UCLA Medical Center. His research focuses on the application of neurophysiological techniques to improve neurological diagnosis and prevent injury to the brain and spinal cord.

== Education and career ==
Nuwer completed all four of his degrees at Stanford University. He earned a Bachelor of Arts in Biology, a Master of Science in Electrical Engineering, and a Doctor of Philosophy in Neuroscience, as well as a Doctor of Medicine.

Nuwer joined the faculty of the David Geffen School of Medicine at UCLA, where he worked in clinical practice, research, and medical education. He served as head of Clinical Neurophysiology at Ronald Reagan UCLA Medical Center and was appointed Distinguished Professor of Neurology.

He served as a delegate to the American Medical Association House of Delegates and represented neurology on the AMA's Current Procedural Terminology (CPT) Advisory Panel and Relative Value Scale Update Committee (RUC).

He served as president of the International Federation of Clinical Neurophysiology, the American Clinical Neurophysiology Society, and the American Society for Neurological Investigation.

== Research ==
Nuwer's research focuses on the application of neurophysiological techniques to improve neurological diagnosis and prevent injury to the brain and spinal cord. His work also focuses on electroencephalography, evoked potentials, epilepsy monitoring, intraoperative neurophysiological monitoring, and critical care neurophysiology. He was the first neurologist to set up an intraoperative evoked potential monitoring service.
