= Journal of Korean Neurosurgical Society =

- Discipline: Neurology, neurosurgery, clinical neurophysiology, neuroradiology
- Language: English
- Edited by: Bum-Tae Kim

Publication details
- History: 1972-present
- Publisher: Korean Neurosurgical Society
- Frequency: Bimonthly
- Impact factor: 1.187 (2018)

Standard abbreviations
- ISO 4: J. Korean Neurosurg. Soc.

Indexing
- ISSN: 2005-3711 (print); 1598-7876 (web)

Links
- Journal homepage; Current issue; Online archive

The Journal of Korean Neurosurgical Society (JKNS) is a bimonthly peer-reviewed medical journal and the official journal of the Korean Neurosurgical Society. All papers have been published in English since July 2005, and the journal was listed in Excerpta Medica database (EMBASE) in 2005 and PubMed in 2007. It has become internationally recognized after being listed in Scientific Citation Index Expanded (SCIE) in 2008 According to the Journal Citation Reports, the journal has a 2019 impact factor of 1.376.
