= Michael Bach (vision scientist) =

German scientist (born 1950)

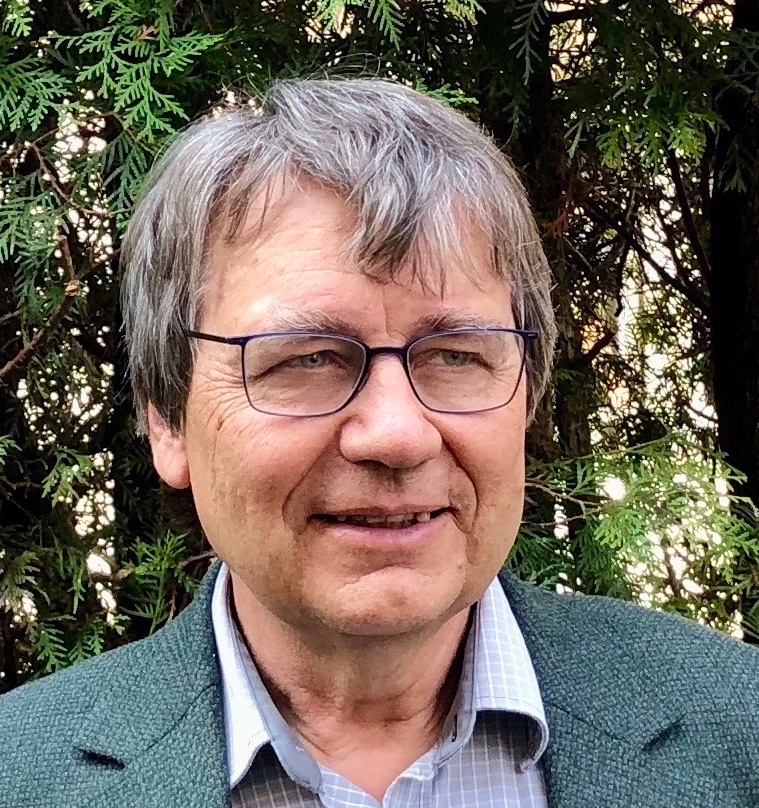
- Michael Bach, April 2020
- Born: 10 April 1950 (age 76); Berlin
- Citizenship: German
- Education: University of Freiburg
- Spouse: Ulrike Bach (née Röhling)
- Awards: Elfriede-Aulhorn Award (2006), Von Graeve Award (2018)
- Scientific career
- Fields: Ophthalmology, clinical electroencephalography, clinical electroretinography, Visual perception, Visual acuity
- Thesis: Interaction between neurones in the visual cortex based on recordings with a multi-microelectrode (1981)
- Doctoral advisors: Burkhart Fischer, Jürgen Krüger
- Website: https://michaelbach.de

Michael Bach (born 10 April 1950) is a German scientist who researches ophthalmology, clinical electroencephalography, clinical electroretinography, visual acuity testing, and visual perception. Bach is the creator of website Optical Illusions & Visual Phenomena, which began receiving over two million hits a day in 2005.

== Life and work ==
Bach was born in Berlin on 10 April 1950. In 1956, he moved with his family to Dortmund, where he attended school. From 1970 to 1972, Bach completed an undergraduate degree in physics at Ruhr University Bochum, then moved to the University of Freiburg, where he studied for a Master's degree in physics. In 1975, he began a part-time position running an electronics workshop in the Department of Psychology, then became a full-time research assistant in the Department of Neurology in 1978. Bach was awarded his Master's in physics in 1977 and his PhD, also in physics, in 1981, on the visual system. In 1981 he moved into a full-time position in the Department of Ophthalmology, rising to Professor in 1998, and being appointed as Head of Section Visual Function/Electrophysiology at the University Eye Hospital in 1999. After Bach's retirement in 2015 he became an Emeritus Scientist, continuing his research.

In 1996, Bach began his service to the International Society for Clinical Electrophysiology of Vision, establishing, with others, standards for clinical electroencephalography, electroretinography and electrooculography, and becoming the society's president from 2004 to 2011.

In 1975, Bach married Ulrike Röhling. They have three adult children and one grandchild.

== Awards ==
- 2006: Elfriede Aulhorn Prize
- 2015: Adachi Award from the International Society for Clinical Electrophysiology of Vision (ISCEV)
- 2015: Augenstern Research Prize
- 2017: Alumni Medal of the University Eye Clinic Munich
- 2018: Honorary membership in the ISCEV

== Research ==
Bach has conducted research in ophthalmology, electroretinography, and visual perception. One strand of his research has been to develop tests of visual acuity, using verbal responding or using brain activity.

As of April 2026, Bach has published 394 scientific papers that have been cited 24873 times, giving him an h-index of 73. According to Neurotree, Bach has 16 academic children and 44 academic grandchildren.

== Illusions ==
Bach began his illusions web site as a hobby some time before 2005. He did not appreciate how popular the site was until he discovered that his internet service provider had suspended his account after it received more than one million hits per day. Bach upgraded his account and continued developing the site.

As of April 2026, Bach's site contained 154 illusions, most interactive, and all with Bach's clear explanations. The site and Bach have won plaudits on the internet, in the news media, and in science journals.

The site has also been used in scientific research into illusions.

== Selected works ==
- Marmor, M. F.; Fulton, A. B.; Holder, G. E.; Miyake, Y.; Brigell, M.; Bach, M. (February 2009). "ISCEV Standard for full-field clinical electroretinography (2008 update)". Documenta Ophthalmologica. 118 (1): 69–77. doi:10.1007/s10633-008-9155-4. PMID 19030905.
- Bach, Michael (January 1996). "The Freiburg Visual Acuity Test — Automatic Measurement of Visual Acuity". Optometry and Vision Science. 73 (1): 49–53. doi:10.1097/00006324-199601000-00008. PMID 8867682.
- Odom, J. Vernon; Bach, Michael; Brigell, Mitchell; Holder, Graham E.; McCulloch, Daphne L.; Tormene, Alma Patrizia (February 2010). "ISCEV standard for clinical visual evoked potentials (2009 update)". Documenta Ophthalmologica. 120 (1): 111–119. doi:10.1007/s10633-009-9195-4. PMID 19826847.
- McCulloch, Daphne L.; Marmor, Michael F.; Brigell, Mitchell G.; Hamilton, Ruth; Holder, Graham E.; Tzekov, Radouil; Bach, Michael (February 2015). "ISCEV Standard for full-field clinical electroretinography (2015 update)". Documenta Ophthalmologica. 130 (1): 1–12. doi:10.1007/s10633-014-9473-7. PMID 25502644.
- Odom, J. Vernon; Bach, Michael; Barber, Colin; Brigell, Mitchell; Marmor, Michael F.; Tormene, Alma Patrizia; Holder, Graham E.; Vaegan (March 2004). "Visual evoked potentials standard (2004)". Documenta Ophthalmologica. 108 (2): 115–123. doi:10.1023/b:doop.0000036790.67234.22. PMID 15455794. S2CID 16956477.
- Schulze-Bonsel, Kilian; Feltgen, Nicolas; Burau, Hermann; Hansen, Lutz; Bach, Michael (1 March 2006). "Visual Acuities 'Hand Motion' and 'Counting Fingers' Can Be Quantified with the Freiburg Visual Acuity Test". Investigative Ophthalmology & Visual Science. 47 (3): 1236–1240. doi:10.1167/iovs.05-0981. PMID 16505064.
- Hood, Donald C.; Bach, Michael; Brigell, Mitchell; Keating, David; Kondo, Mineo; Lyons, Jonathan S.; Marmor, Michael F.; McCulloch, Daphne L.; Palmowski-Wolfe, Anja M. (February 2012). "ISCEV standard for clinical multifocal electroretinography (mfERG) (2011 edition)". Documenta Ophthalmologica. 124 (1): 1–13. doi:10.1007/s10633-011-9296-8. PMC 4466109. PMID 22038576.
- Heckenlively, John R.; Arden, Geoffrey B. (2006). Principles and Practice of Clinical Electrophysiology of Vision. MIT Press. ISBN 978-0-262-08346-1.
- Bach, Michael; Brigell, Mitchell G.; Hawlina, Marko; Holder, Graham E.; Johnson, Mary A.; McCulloch, Daphne L.; Meigen, Thomas; Viswanathan, Suresh (February 2013). "ISCEV standard for clinical pattern electroretinography (PERG): 2012 update". Documenta Ophthalmologica. 126 (1): 1–7. doi:10.1007/s10633-012-9353-y. PMID 23073702.
