= Sopite syndrome =

Fatigue and mood changes in response to prolonged periods of motion

- Specialty: Neurology
- Symptoms: Drowsiness, yawning, disinclination for work, lack of social participation, mood changes, apathy, sleep disturbances, other fatigue-related symptoms

The sopite syndrome (/soʊˈpaɪt/; from Latin sopire 'to put to sleep') is a neurological disorder that relates symptoms of fatigue, drowsiness, and mood changes to prolonged periods of motion. The sopite syndrome has been attributed to motion-induced drowsiness such as that experienced by a baby when rocked. Researchers Ashton Graybiel and James Knepton at the US Naval Aerospace Medical Research Laboratory first used the term "the sopite syndrome" in 1976, to refer to the sometimes sole manifestation of motion sickness, though other researchers have referred to it as "Sopite syndrome."

== Signs and symptoms ==
Several symptoms are associated with the sopite syndrome. Typical responses include:

- drowsiness
- yawning
- disinclination for work
- lack of social participation
- mood changes
- apathy
- sleep disturbances
- other fatigue-related symptoms

The sopite syndrome is distinguished from other manifestations of motion sickness (i.e. nausea, dizziness, etc.) in that it may occur before other symptoms of motion sickness or in their absence. The sopite syndrome may persist even after an individual has adapted to the other symptoms associated with motion-induced sickness.

=== Severity ===
The effects of the sopite syndrome may range from minor physical inconveniences to hazardous conditions. People who operate automobiles, airplanes, etc., may experience impaired motor function due to the motions of the vehicle. These impairments often result in a decreased attention span; those who consider themselves well-rested may still succumb to drowsiness at inopportune moments. The sopite syndrome may therefore contribute to motor vehicle accidents in which automobile operators fall asleep at the wheel. However, the sopite syndrome itself does not directly result in death.

A subject experiencing the sopite syndrome on a frequent basis may increase the number of hours spent sleeping by fifty percent. A study of motion sickness occurrences in workers on an offshore oil vessel showed a large majority of participants experienced mild symptoms of fatigue. Many participants also experienced severe sleep disturbances. These symptoms were associated with impaired task performance.

== Causes ==
The sopite syndrome has been associated with visually-induced and vestibular motion sickness. Other factors associated with drowsiness such as darkness or physical fatigue may intensify the effects of motion-induced sleepiness. The sopite syndrome may occur with little motional stimulus (though the greatest effects tend to be observed in subjects who have been exposed for longer periods of time), and often persists for a time after the motional stimulus has ceased.

=== Susceptibility ===
A study of certain aspects of motion sickness among medical transport attendants showed that the onset of the sopite syndrome is likely to occur independently of the mode of transportation; little difference was observed in the frequency of sopite symptoms for ground transport compared to air transport. Also, the length of time exposed to vehicular motion did not appear to affect the occurrence (or lack thereof) or severity of the sopite syndrome. No difference was observed in the incidence of the sopite syndrome for men versus women.

The sopite syndrome is likely a cumulative disorder. For instance, when a subject has the flu, a hangover may exacerbate the symptoms of the illness. A subject normally resistant to motion sickness may experience symptoms of motion sickness when also experiencing flu-like (or hangover-like) symptoms.

== Mechanism ==
The exact mechanism for the induction of the sopite syndrome is still unknown; however, a leading theory asserts that the sopite syndrome (and perhaps motion sickness in general) is somehow related to the reticular formation, an area of the brainstem associated with arousal. A study of motion-induced effects on the P50 potential (a measure of arousal) showed that subjects exposed to motion environments experience decreased sensory gating, which involves the filtering of information in the brain. In the case of Space Motion Sickness, the unweighting of otolith organs can lead to a sensory mismatch between the visual, vestibular, and somatosensory systems. Motion studies in which the subjects lacked vestibular systems did not experience symptoms of the sopite syndrome or other manifestations of motion sickness.

=== Vestibular system ===
The role of the vestibular system in the inducement of the sopite syndrome or related symptoms may be difficult to ascertain. Researchers must compare the results of test subjects experiencing a motion environment to a control environment lacking motion. Experimental subjects who suffered increased fatigue in a rotating environment apparently recovered from this side effect when the same environment ceased motion. In similar studies, control subjects lacking vestibular function did not experience the motion-induced drowsiness associated with the sopite syndrome, while subjects with normal-functioning vestibular systems did experience increased fatigue in the rotating environments.

=== Visual stimulus ===
The relation of the visual-vestibular stimulus to the sopite syndrome may be observed when comparing airline cockpit crew with cabin crew. While the former typically experience more confined conditions, the airline cabin crew tend to experience more symptoms associated with sopite syndrome; this effect may be attributed to the lack of visual validation and increased movement of the cabin crew.

=== Biochemicals ===
Certain hormones or biochemicals likely affect the pathways associated with motion sickness in general and the sopite syndrome in particular. Studies reported by Kennedy, Drexler and Kennedy (2010) have investigated the role of cortisol and melatonin (a hormone associated with the maintenance of circadian rhythms) in motion-induced drowsiness. Subjects were exposed to vection-producing environments (virtual reality, for example) and symptoms were evaluated using a Simulator Sickness Questionnaire. Sopite symptoms were also measured using a developed scale. The levels of endogenous cortisol and melatonin were then compared with levels before the subjects were tested in the vection environments. Most subjects showed increased levels of endogenous cortisol and melatonin post-vection. Melatonin may therefore be involved in the drowsy state associated with the sopite syndrome.

=== Noradrenergic pathways ===
The inhibition of noradrenergic pathways has also been associated with symptoms of the sopite syndrome. Studies have shown that animals exposed to motion environments commonly exhibit drowsiness and disinclination for activity. These animals show slowed electroencephalography waves, which are involved in the firing of neurons in the brain. The locus coeruleuses of these animals are apparently deactivated. The sopite syndrome is therefore linked to inhibition of the locus coeruleus-noradrenergic pathways. As such, noradrenaline releasers may be useful in counteracting these symptoms.

== Diagnosis ==
=== Classification ===
The sopite syndrome is classified as a symptom-complex centered on drowsiness. It may be distinguished from ordinary fatigue. Researchers have previously studied this effect through the use of rotating rooms. When subjects who had previously shown minimal susceptibility to general motion sickness and fatigue (in this particular case, four military officers) were recruited to live in a rotating room for several days, they exhibited several signs of drowsiness, such as yawning and frequent napping. Despite numerous activities designed to promote awareness and excitability, the subjects showed decreased motivation to socialize or perform physical activities. Many of these symptoms could be attributed to the vestibular stimulation of the rotating rooms.

== Management ==
Many drugs taken to relieve typical symptoms of motion sickness (including nausea, dizziness, etc.) contain compounds that may exacerbate drowsiness. Antihistamines are commonly used to treat motion sickness; however, side effects include drowsiness and impaired cognitive abilities. Anticholinergics such as scopolamine have also proved effective against motion sickness, but may induce drowsiness. These treatments may be combined with stimulants to counteract typical motion-induced nausea and dizziness while also preventing sedation.

However, many stimulants possess addictive properties, which result in a high potential for substance abuse. Some stimulants also tend to interfere with normal sleep patterns. Modafinil has been studied as a possible treatment for the sopite syndrome that does not appear to have the same side effects of normal stimulants. Modafinil appears to be effective when taken in combination with anticholinergics such as scopolamine, but studies of Modafinil-only treatments for motion sickness remain inconclusive.

== Research ==
The sopite syndrome may be difficult to test due to the nature of the symptoms. Indicators such as drowsiness, mood changes, and apathy must be observed and graded objectively. Therefore, many of the results obtained from studies of the sopite syndrome are not sufficiently repeatable for the purposes of scientific writing.

=== Questionnaires ===
A typical method for determining the effects of the sopite syndrome is through the use of one or several questionnaires. The available questionnaires for motion sickness and sopite syndrome are described by Lawson. Two such questionnaires widely used to evaluate motion sickness are the Pensacola Diagnostic Index and the Motion Sickness Questionnaire. These questionnaires are limited, however, in that they group symptoms of drowsiness with other non-sopite related effects, such as nausea and dizziness. Motion sickness is measured based on the cumulative ratings of all these symptoms without distinguishing different levels for each effect.

A Motion Sickness Assessment Questionnaire has been developed to test the multiple dimensions of motion sickness more thoroughly; this survey defines motion sickness as gastrointestinal (involving nausea), peripheral (referring to thermoregulatory effects such as clamminess and sweating), central (involving symptoms such as dizziness and lightheadedness), and sopite-related. This questionnaire may more accurately determine how subjects experience sopite symptoms relative to other motion sickness effects. Another questionnaire designed to measure sleepiness is the Epworth Sleepiness Scale.

=== Optokinetic drum ===
An optokinetic drum may be used to study visually induced sopite effects. The optokinetic drum is a rotating instrument in which test subjects are seated facing the wall of the drum. The interior surface of the drum is normally striped; thus, as the drum rotates, the subject's eyes are subject to a moving visual field while the subject remains stationary. The speed of the drum and the duration of the test may be varied. Control groups are placed in a drum without stripes or rotation. After exposure to the rotating drum, subjects are surveyed to determine their susceptibility to motion sickness. A study in which the optokinetic drum was used to test the symptoms of the sopite syndrome showed increased mood changes in response to the visual cues, though these effects were compounded by other environmental factors such as boredom and lack of activity.
