= Michael Bach =

Michael Bach may refer to:

- Michael Bach (entomologist) (1808–1878), German entomologist
- Michael Bach (musician) (born 1958), German cellist, composer, and visual artist
- Michael Bach (rower) (born 1960), former American rower
- Michael Bach (vision scientist) (born 1950), German vision scientist
