= Journal of Clinical Neurophysiology =

- Discipline: Neurophysiology
- Language: English
- Edited by: Aatif M. Husain

Publication details
- History: 1984-present
- Publisher: Lippincott Williams & Wilkins
- Frequency: Bimonthly
- Open access: Hybrid
- Impact factor: 2.4 (2022)

Standard abbreviations
- ISO 4: J. Clin. Neurophysiol.

Indexing
- ISSN: 0736-0258 (print); 1537-1603 (web)
- OCLC no.: 09069439

Links
- Journal homepage; Online access; Online archive; Journal page on publisher's website

The Journal of Clinical Neurophysiology is a bimonthly peer-reviewed medical journal covering clinical neurophysiology. It was established in 1984. It is the official journal of the American Clinical Neurophysiology Society (previously the American Electroencephalographic Society). It is published by Lippincott Williams & Wilkins and the editor-in-chief is Aatif M. Husain (Duke University).

== Abstracting and indexing ==
The journal is abstracted and indexed in:

- CINAHL
- Current Contents/Clinical Medicine
- Elsevier BIOBASE
- Embase
- Index Medicus/MEDLINE/PubMed
- Science Citation Index Expanded
- Scopus

According to the Journal Citation Reports, the journal has a 2022 impact factor of 2.4, ranking it 143 out of 212 journals in the category "Clinical Neurology" and 206 out of 272 journals in the category "Neurosciences".
