= Sensory overload =

State of overwhelm caused by an excess of sensory input

- Specialty: Psychiatry
- Symptoms: Irritability; poor eye contact; muscle tension; sweating; insomnia; restlessness; aggression; difficulty concentrating; fatigue
- Complications: Self-harm; difficulties with social interaction; social isolation; avoidance of tasks or activities
- Prevention: Avoid or limit intense sensory stimulation; identify triggers of sensory overload
- Treatment: Accommodations; occupational therapy

Sensory overload refers to an overwhelming state that occurs when incoming environmental input across one or more physical senses exceeds a person's neurological filtering or processing threshold. Sensory overload is a common comorbidity in conditions such as ADHD, schizophrenia, and autism.

== Causes ==
=== External triggers ===
Sensory overload can result from the overstimulation of any of the body's senses.

- Hearing: high-volume noises or sounds from multiple sources, or continuous background sounds, such as several people talking at once, traffic noise, or background noises from large crowds or office spaces.
- Sight: bright, surprising, or strobing lights (such as fluorescent lights and reflections) cluttered or closed-off spaces, areas with complex surface patterns, or crowded spaces with excessive movement.
- Smell: strong, unpleasant, or pungent aromas, as well as ambient scents that conflict with other environmental stimuli, can overload olfactory processing.
- Taste: consuming foods with intense flavors, experiencing food texture aversions, or encountering strong tasting products (such as flavored medicine or dental products)
- Touch: tactile sensations such as being touched by another person, hypersensitivity to the texture and feeling of various fabrics or clothing tags on skin, extreme temperatures and temperature fluctuations, or discomfort from medical or examination materials.
- Vestibular: sensations related to movement and balance including rapid head or body movements, sudden positional changes, motion-induced dizziness, motion sickness, or other motion sensations.

=== Internal triggers ===
Sensory overload can also be triggered by internal states that deplete the brain's ability to filter out background stimuli.

- Fatigue: exhaustion impairs the brain's cognitive filtering mechanisms which makes it harder to ignore background inputs and leaves individuals more susceptible to sensory overload.

== Signs and symptoms ==
There are a wide variety of symptoms that have been found to be associated with sensory overload. These symptoms can occur in both children and adults. Some of these symptoms include:

- Stress reactions such as avoidance or withdraw from social settings and behavior that displays physical aggression
- Confusion
- Irritability
- Shutting down, or refusing to participate in activities and interact with others
- Anxiety
- Increased blood pressure
- Making poor eye contact
- Constantly changing activities without completing any tasks
- Having trouble with social interactions
- Extremely high or extremely low activity levels
- Muscle tension
- Fidgeting and restlessness
- Angry outbursts
- Insomnia
- Difficulty concentrating

== As a component of other disorders and conditions ==
Sensory overload has been found to be associated with other disorders and conditions such as:

- Attention deficit hyperactivity disorder (ADHD)
  - People with ADHD display hypersensitivity to sensory stimuli from a young age; this hypersensitivity often persists into adulthood. People with ADHD do not seem to differ in sensory processing in regard to most event-related potentials; however, they do display significant differences in event related potential responses involved with late cognitive processing such as P300, CNV, and Pe, which may indicate that hypersensitivity in ADHD is caused by abnormalities in the expectation of and allocation of attention to sensory stimuli. Abnormalities in later cognitive processing may contribute to hypersensitivity and the sensation of sensory overload in people with ADHD.
- Post-traumatic stress disorder (PTSD)
  - People with PTSD are prone to sensory overload due to a general hypersensitivity to sensory stimuli partially caused by sensory gating issues; this is supported by the fact that people with PTSD have impaired P50 gating and an inability to filter redundant auditory stimuli. Irregularities in the production of and response to neurotransmitters is one possible etiology for sensory overload in people with PTSD; specifically, people with PTSD may display hypersensitivity to stimuli due to chronic homeostatic imbalances in dopamine and norepinephrine. The hypersensitivity of people with PTSD to sensory stimuli is supported by an augmented P300 event-related potential response compared to healthy controls which indicates a semi-permanent heightened attention to deviant and salient stimuli.
- Obsessive–compulsive disorder (OCD)
  - People with OCD display a cognitive inflexibility to changing environments. Those diagnosed with OCD are hypersensitive to stimuli that are indicative of negative situations, and this hypersensitivity may contribute to sensory overload. It is theorized that people with OCD have compulsions to carry out repetitive actions due to self-doubt and a desire to achieve perfection. A common trigger for compulsions in people with OCD is the perception of contamination; people with OCD commonly deal with the perception of contamination with repetitive hand washing. In a situation where a person with OCD is subjected to an environmental stimuli that elicits compulsion, such as getting dirt on their hands, they may feel overwhelmed by sensory stimuli and deal with this sensory overload through mitigating the stress with compulsions such as repetitive hand washing.
- Schizophrenia (see also sensory gating)
  - People with schizophrenia are prone to sensory overload due to their inability to divert their attention from repetitive and unimportant sensory stimuli. The inability to focus on relevant stimuli and filter out unnecessary and excessive sensory stimuli displayed in schizophrenics is due to physiological sensory gating issues, and the paired click P50 test can be used to determine if an individual has abnormalities in sensory gating and is therefore prone to sensory overload. A proposed theory that explains sensory overload in schizophrenic patients is that abnormalities in alpha-7 and low affinity nicotinic acetylcholine receptors prevent normal transduction pathways between the cortex and hippocampus that facilitate sensory gating.
- Misophonia, a pathological 'hatred of sound'
  - People with misophonia display hypersensitivity to certain pattern-based noises such as the sound of chewing, slurping, finger tapping, foot shuffling, throat clearing, pen clicking, and keyboard tapping; people with misophonia respond to triggering sounds with emotional distress and increased hormonal activity of the sympathetic system. Individuals with misophonia are subjected to noises that trigger misophonic responses, they may feel as if they are being overloaded by auditory stimuli and seek to escape from or block out the triggering noise. Compared to healthy controls, people with misophonia display a lower N100 peak in response to mismatch negative (MMN), but this is not a reliable biomarker for the condition and sensory overload. A more reliable indicator that hints at proneness to sensory overload is heightened activation of the anterior insular cortex which is evoked by trigger noises and can be measured by fMRI; the anterior insular cortex may be involved with the pathway that gives rise to the sensation of sensory overload in people with misophonia.
- Synesthesia
  - There is evidence that the visual cortex of people with grapheme-color synesthesia is more excitable than that of typical people; additionally, people with grapheme-color synesthesia respond more strongly to visual stimuli compared to people without the condition. People with grapheme-color synesthesia report feeling visual stress and discomfort in response to gratings of mid and high spatial frequencies, correlating to a sensory overload response evoked by intense visual stimuli.
- Generalized anxiety disorder (GAD)
  - People with general anxiety disorder are highly sensitive to external anxiety triggering stimuli and deal with exposure to these triggers through neurotic thoughts. People with GAD are biased to perceive sensory stimuli as negative or threatening and this bias feeds into negative thought processes which further exacerbate feelings of worry, stress, and anxiety. People with GAD are hypersensitive and hypervigilant to ambiguous, neutral, and emotional stimuli and often compartmentalize such stimuli as negative. People with GAD are prone to sensory overload when in novel settings or interacting with new people since ambiguous and neutral stimuli in these instances are usually processed as threatening or negative; adolescents and children with GAD are especially avoidant of and distressed by novel stimuli which is theorized to be elicited by either a hyperactive sympathetic nervous system or an under-active parasympathetic nervous system.
- Autism spectrum disorder (ASD)
  - Individuals with autism typically have sensory processing differences, meaning their brain reacts to stimuli differently than someone who is neurotypical; these differences result in either hypersensitivity or hyposensitivity. Specifically, people with ASD experience auditory hypersensitivity, which can lead to sensory overload. Although autistic people do not have abnormalities in P50 sensory gating, they have anomalies in sensory gating related to the N100 test which indicates an irregularity in attention-related direction and top-down mental pathways. It is speculated that disturbances and issues with directing attention towards relevant or salient stimuli, evinced by deviations from standard P200 and N100 responses, is partially responsible for the sensation of being overwhelmed by sensory stimuli in people with autism.Additionally, it is commonly noted that people with ASD experience a heightened sensitivity to lights and textures. Sensory overload amongst those with ASD autistic can manifest in a multitude of behavioral responses, including withdrawal or avoidance of stimuli, engagement in repetitive or self-stimulatory behaviors (stimming), and meltdowns characterized by intense emotional reactions. In emergency department (ED) settings, overwhelming sensory stimuli, and unfamiliar schedules can frequently trigger sensory overload in autistic children. This environmental friction within ED settings causes anxiety and emotional distress for autistic children, while also creating substantial obstacles for clinicians, ultimately increasing procedural hurdles and reliance on physical or chemical restraints. A significant proportion of autistic people also have epilepsy, which can intensify the brain's sensitivity and potentially exacerbate sensory overload experiences.
- Tourette syndrome
  - It has been suggested that people with Tourette syndrome have a hypersensitivity to bodily sensation that originates in higher order processing partially the result of distorted and higher than average amplitude of afferent somatic signals. People with Tourette syndrome sense urges to do tics that are often localized to regions of the body that carry out the tic response. It is theorized that tics might be caused by sensory processing issues where sensations trigger movements which manifest as tics. Additionally, people with Tourette syndrome display a moderate inability to inhibit distracting stimuli which might lead to sensory overload. People with Tourette syndrome may be prone to carry out tics in an environment of overwhelming sensory stimuli.
- Fibromyalgia
  - People with fibromyalgia are hypersensitive to intense stimuli such as bright lights, loud noises, perfumes, and cold temperatures; people with the condition also have hyper-excitable nociceptors. When people with fibromyalgia are subjected to intense stimuli, they experience sensory overload in the form of pain. It is theorized that abnormal activity of the left dorsolateral prefrontal cortex and reduced production of or reception to serotonin are partially responsible for the sensation of pain in response to intense stimuli.
- Myalgic encephalomyelitis/chronic fatigue syndrome (ME/CFS)
  - People with myalgic encephalomyelitis/chronic fatigue syndrome display a hypersensitivity to noxious stimuli, stress, and pain. These sensitivities are partially explained by abnormal neurotransmitter pathways involving serotonin and acetylcholine. When people with the condition are exposed to intense stimuli, they report pain, fatigue, nausea, and reduced cognitive abilities; chronic sensory overload causes the sensation of brain fog.
- Acquired Brain Injury
  - Sensory hypersensitivity is a recognized complication following acquired brain injury, such as stroke or traumatic brain injury, commonly presenting as light and sound intolerance in both acute and chronic recovery stages. Unlike other clinical conditions where selective attentional impairments act as primary drivers, sensory overload following acquired brain injury is linked to a combination of slowed cognitive processing speed, altered perceptual thresholds, and structural or functional neural pathway abnormalities.
- Migraine
  - People with migraines are prone to sensory overload both during and between active migraine attacks due to an impaired or entirely absent ability to habituate to recurring sensory input. Electrophysiological evaluations show that during the phase between migraine episodes, central sensory filtering mechanisms such as habituation fail to suppress visual and auditory signals.

== Prevention ==
Preventative measures for sensory overload mainly include environmental modifications; these changes may reduce the prevalence of overload in a specific space or help assist in the curation of a calming space for when overload occurs. Light sensitivity has shown to be prevalent amongst those who experience sensory overload. Minimising the amount of lights or reducing the brightness of an area will aid the minimisation of visual overstimulation. Other adjustments could be made based on personal sensitivity; such as reducing noise, utilising warm-coloured lights and decor, etc. Being aware of one's own triggers can help when navigating social areas to avoid over-stimulation or identify what adjustments could be made to commonly visited spaces (home, school, etc.).

== Treatment ==
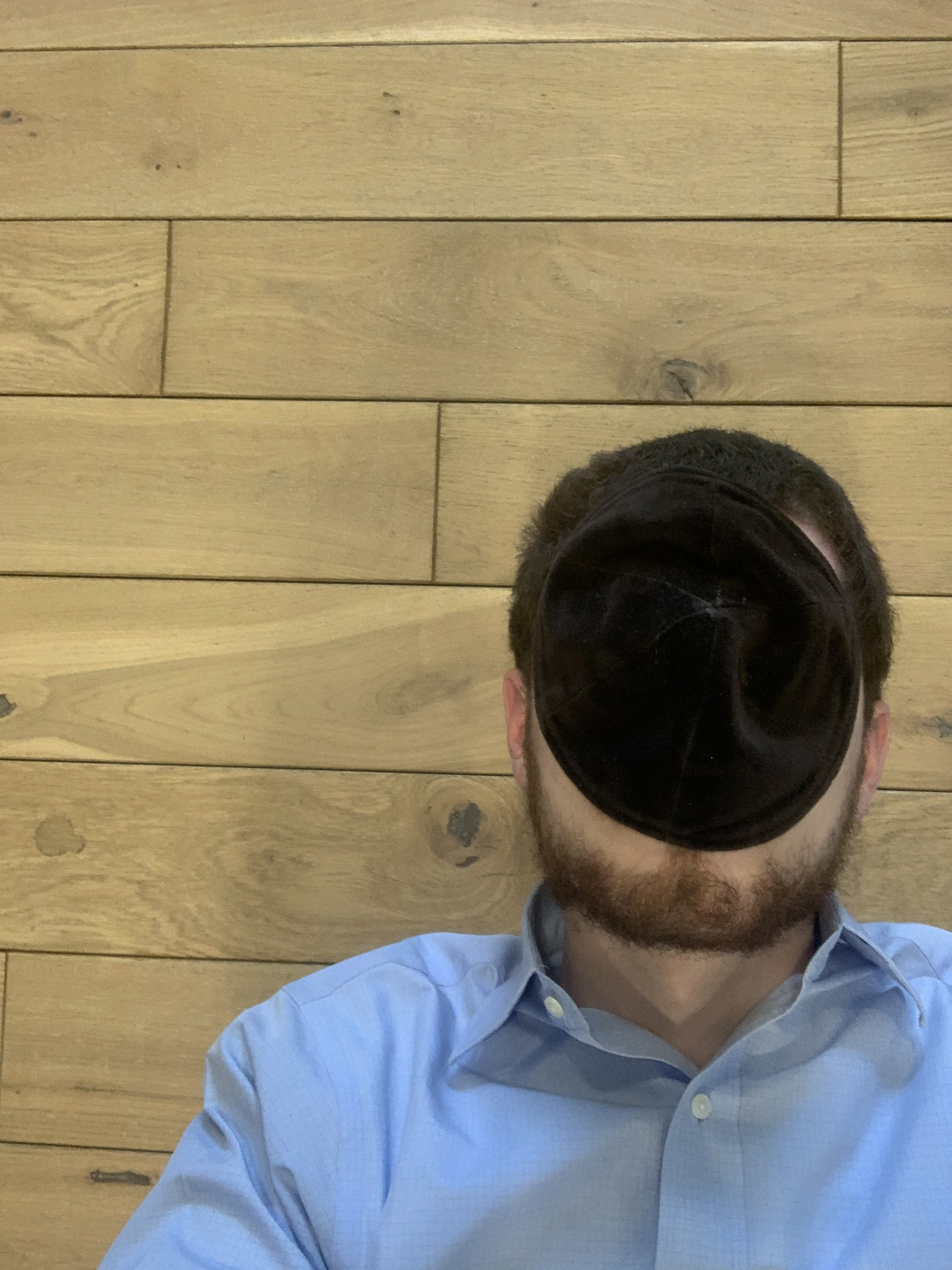
Ad hoc use of sensory deprivation; using a kippah to block light during an unexpected moment of hypersensitivity.

Managing sensory overload is rooted in recognising common triggers and curating healthy coping strategies for when overload occurs . This concept is one the foundations for occupational therapy. Occupational therapists aim to not only help patients identify their triggers, but educate them on methods to regulate their emotions when overwhelmed to reduce the severity of symptoms. Sensory integration therapy is a method that is commonly implemented by occupational therapists. In this technique, similar to traditional occupational therapy, therapists evaluate their patient's behaviour in response to be dysregulated and determine the most beneficial interventions and/or coping mechanisms for them to implement; after that information is acquired, the treatment typically involves integrating the newly developed coping strategies into real-life scenarios. Engaging in these forms of therapy is highly recommended by researchers to improve the quality of life for those who experience sensory overload; being aware of triggers may help with navigating new places, increase participation in social activities, and improve social connections. If one is unable to access therapy, sensory overload has shown to be less severe when making the proper environmental adjustments to accommodate any known triggers; or, having a designated area to retreat to when overload arises.

== History ==
Sociologist Georg Simmel contributed to the description of sensory overload in his 1903 essay "The Metropolis and Mental Life". Simmel describes an urban landscape of constant sensory stimuli against which the city-dweller must create a barrier in order to remain sane. For Simmel, the sensory overload of modern urban life depletes the body's reservoirs of energy, leading, among other things, to a jaded or blasé [blasiert] mentality and a calculating, instrumentalizing approach to others. Simmel's approach can be compared to Freud's writings on shell shock as well as Walter Benjamin's analysis of "shock" and urban life in his 1939 essay "On Some Motifs in Baudelaire".

=== Case studies ===
Not many studies have been done on sensory overload, but an example of a sensory overload study was reported by Lipowski (1975) as part of his research review on the topic that discussed the work done by Japanese researchers at Tohoku University. The Tohoku researchers exposed their subjects to intense visual and auditory stimuli presented randomly in a condition of confinement ranging in duration from three to five hours. Subjects showed heightened and sustained arousal as well as mood changes such as aggression, anxiety, and sadness. Additionally, a study by Nair et al. (2022) explored how light intensity and tones influenced the behavior of children with Autism. The researchers detailed how children with Autism tend to experience hypersensitivity to light, which may cause sensory overload; leading to heightened levels of anxiety which could reduce their willingness to be within that space. The results of the study reflected that low-intensity and warm colored lights were preferred by participants due to their calming affects, making it a comfortable environment for those with sensory issues.

== Marketing ==
It can be difficult to distinguish and understand information when experiencing sensory overload. Even such meaningless stimuli such as white noise or flickering lights may induce sensory overload. Sensory overload is common among consumers as many corporations compete with each other especially when advertising. Advertisers use attention-grabbing colours, words, sounds, textures, designs and much more. This can influence the consumer, as they will be drawn to a product that is more attention grabbing.

=== Implications of public policy ===
Implications of public policy in regards to information overload have two main assumptions: first, that consumers have a great deal of processing capacity and a great deal of time to process information, and secondly, that consumers can always absorb the information without serious concern about how much information has been presented. As researchers have pointed out, policymakers should better understand the difference between the process and availability of information. This will help decrease the possibility of information overload. In some cases, the time to process such information in a commercial can be 6 out of 30 seconds. This can lead consumers to be confused and overloaded with such fast-paced information thrown at them. To understand how consumers process information, three factors must be analyzed, such as the amount of information given, the source of corrective information and the way in which it is all presented to the consumer. Different types of media have different processing demands. One possibility is to present information through a TV commercial which states simple facts about a product and then encourages the audience to visit a website for more details. Therefore, the short processing time involved in watching a commercial is not overloaded with information, saving the consumer from sensory overload.

=== Implications for the consumers ===
Consumers are forced to learn to cope with overloading and an abundance of information, through radio, billboards, television, newspapers and much more. Information is everywhere and being thrown at consumers from every angle and direction. Therefore, Naresh K. Malhotra, author of the paper "Information and Sensory Overload", presents the following guidelines. First, consumers must try to limit the intake of external information and sensory inputs to avoid sensory overload. This can be done by tuning out irrelevant information presented by the media and marketers to get the attention of the consumer. Second, record important information externally rather than mentally. Information can be easily forgotten mentally once the individual becomes overloaded by their sense. Thus it is recommended for a consumer to write down important information rather than store it mentally. Third, when examining a product, do not overload their senses by examining more than five products at a time. This will lead to confusion and frustration. Fourth, process information where there is less irrelevant information around. This will eliminate external information and sensory distractions such as white noise and other information presented in an environment. Finally, it is important to make consuming a pleasant and relaxed experience. This will help diminish the stress, overwhelming feeling, and experience of sensory overload.

== See also ==
- Sensory adaptation
- Sensory deprivation
- Sensory substitution
- Catatonia
- Sensory processing sensitivity
