= RETeval =

Portable electroretinography device

RETeval is a portable, handheld electroretinography (ERG) device developed by LKC Technologies for assessing retinal function. It enables ERG testing without pharmacologic pupil dilation and without corneal contact electrodes, allowing use in clinical, screening, and point-of-care environments.

== Overview ==
Electroretinography measures the electrical responses of retinal cells—including photoreceptors, bipolar cells, and ganglion cells—to light stimulation. Traditional ERG systems typically require pupil dilation and corneal electrodes.

RETeval is designed as a non-mydriatic alternative, using skin electrodes and automated stimulus calibration. This allows ERG testing in settings where conventional systems may be impractical, including primary care, mobile screening, and bedside evaluation.

== Technology ==
=== Skin electrode recording ===
RETeval uses disposable adhesive skin electrodes placed below the eye rather than corneal contact electrodes. These electrodes detect electrical signals generated by the retina in response to light stimulation, which are conducted through ocular tissues to the skin surface. This approach avoids the need for topical anesthesia and may improve tolerability in some patients.

=== Pupil size compensation ===
The device incorporates infrared-based pupil monitoring and adjusts flash luminance to maintain constant retinal illuminance (measured in trolands). This enables reliable ERG measurements without pharmacologic dilation.

=== Portable design ===
RETeval is battery-powered and handheld, allowing use outside traditional electrophysiology laboratories. Portable ERG systems have been developed to improve accessibility to retinal function testing, particularly in screening contexts.

== Clinical applications ==
=== Diabetic retinopathy ===
RETeval has been widely studied in the detection and monitoring of diabetic retinopathy. ERG abnormalities, particularly delayed implicit time, have been shown to correlate with disease severity.

Portable ERG systems such as RETeval have been shown to be effective for screening vision-threatening diabetic retinopathy and may detect functional abnormalities before structural changes are visible.

=== Other retinal and optic nerve disorders ===
RETeval has also been used in clinical and research settings for:

- Retinitis pigmentosa
- Glaucoma
- Age-related macular degeneration

ERG-based measures such as the photopic negative response (PhNR) are used to assess ganglion cell function in optic neuropathies.

== Comparison with conventional ERG ==
Peer-reviewed studies have evaluated the performance of portable ERG systems. Reported findings include reproducible ERG responses and potential clinical utility in screening and monitoring retinal disease, although differences from conventional systems have been noted.

== Research and validation ==
Multiple peer-reviewed studies have evaluated the clinical performance of portable ERG systems, including RETeval.

A comparative study found that RETeval can produce reproducible ERG responses with diagnostic utility, although amplitudes may differ from those obtained using conventional systems.

Other studies have demonstrated its utility in screening for diabetic retinopathy and assessing retinal function in patients with systemic disease.

== Regulatory status ==
RETeval has received regulatory clearance in multiple regions, including approval by the U.S. Food and Drug Administration for use as an aid in the detection of retinal dysfunction.

== See also ==
- Electroretinography
- Diabetic retinopathy
- Glaucoma
