= Optokinetic drum =

- Synonyms: Catford drum
- Purpose: test vision

An optokinetic drum—also called a Catford drum—is a rotating instrument to test vision in which individuals are seated facing the wall of the drum. The interior surface of the drum is normally striped; thus, as the drum rotates, the subject's eyes are subject to a moving visual field while the subject remains stationary, this phenomenon is called optokinetic nystagmus. The speed of the drum and the duration of the test may be varied. Control groups are placed in a drum without stripes or rotation. After exposure to the rotating drum, subjects are surveyed to determine their susceptibility to motion sickness. A study in which the optokinetic drum was used to test the symptoms of the sopite syndrome showed increased mood changes in response to the visual cues, though these effects were compounded by other environmental factors such as boredom and lack of activity.

== See also ==
- Electrooculography
- International Society for Clinical Electrophysiology of Vision
- Nystagmus
- Orthoptist
