= Neurology =

Medical specialty dealing with disorders of the nervous system

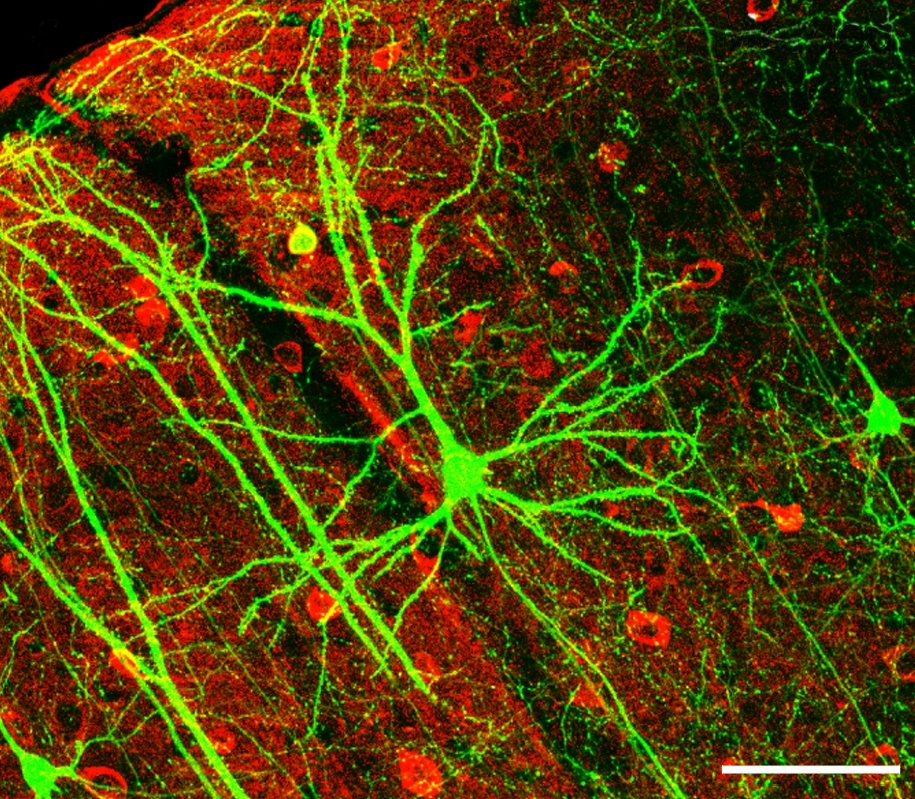
- A network of dendrites from neurons in a hippocampus
- System: Nervous system
- Significant diseases: Neuropathy, dementia, stroke, encephalopathy, Parkinson's disease, epilepsy, meningitis, muscular dystrophy, migraine, attention deficit hyperactivity disorder, narcolepsy
- Significant tests: Computed axial tomography, MRI scan, lumbar puncture, electroencephalography
- Specialist: Neurologist
- Glossary: Glossary of medicine

Neurology (from Greek: νεῦρον (neûron), "string, nerve" and the suffix -logia, "study of") is the branch of medicine dealing with the diagnosis and treatment of all categories of conditions and diseases involving the nervous system, which comprises the brain, the spinal cord and the peripheral nerves. Neurological practice relies heavily on the field of neuroscience, the scientific study of the nervous system, using various techniques of neurotherapy.

A neurologist is a physician specializing in neurology and trained to investigate, diagnose and treat neurological disorders. Neurologists diagnose and treat myriad neurologic conditions, including stroke, epilepsy, movement disorders such as Parkinson's disease, brain infections, autoimmune neurologic disorders such as multiple sclerosis, sleep disorders, brain injury, headache disorders like migraine, tumors of the brain and dementias such as Alzheimer's disease. Neurologists may also have roles in clinical research, clinical trials, and basic or translational research. Neurology is a nonsurgical specialty; its corresponding surgical specialty is neurosurgery.

== History ==
The academic discipline began between the 17th and 18th centuries with the work and research of many neurologists such as Thomas Willis, Robert Whytt, Matthew Baillie, Charles Bell, Moritz Heinrich Romberg, Duchenne de Boulogne, William A. Hammond, Jean-Martin Charcot, C. Miller Fisher and John Hughlings Jackson. Neo-Latin neurologia appeared in various texts from 1610 denoting an anatomical focus on the nerves (variably understood as vessels), and was most notably used by Willis, who preferred Greek νευρολογία.

== Training ==
Neurologist
Occupation
- Names: Physician, Medical Practitioner
- Occupation type: Profession
- Activity sectors: Medicine

Description
- Education required: M.D. or D.O. (US), M.B.B.S. (UK), D.M. (Doctorate of Medicine) (India), M.B. B.Ch. B.A.O. (Republic of Ireland)
- Fields of employment: Hospitals, Clinics

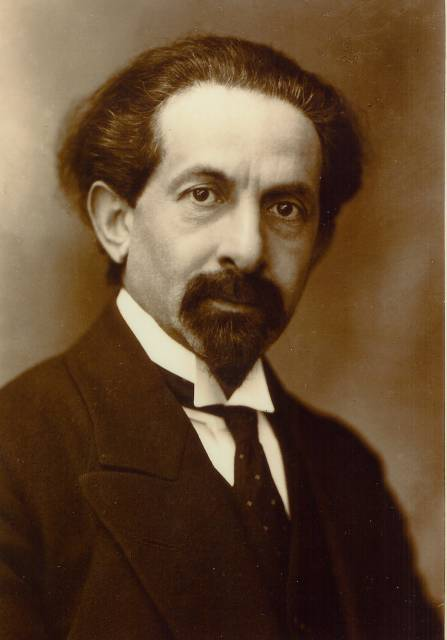
Polish neurologist Edward Flatau greatly influenced the developing field of neurology. He published a human brain atlas in 1894 and wrote a fundamental book on migraines in 1912.

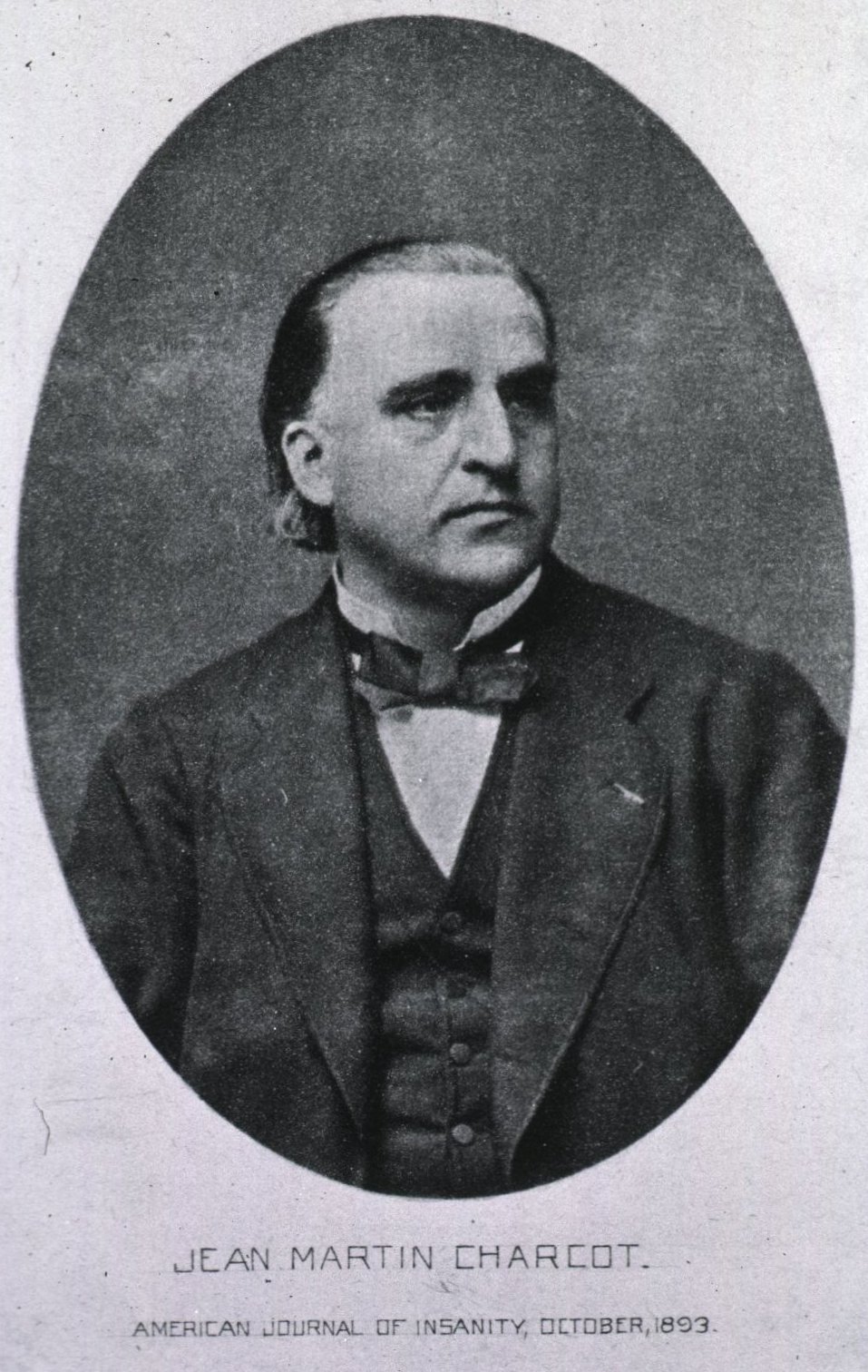
Jean-Martin Charcot is considered one of the fathers of neurology.

In the United States and Canada, neurologists are physicians who have completed a postgraduate training period known as residency specializing in neurology after graduation from medical school. This additional training period typically lasts four years, with the first year devoted to training in internal medicine. On average, neurologists complete a total of eight to ten years of training. This includes four years of medical school, four years of residency and an optional one to two years of fellowship.

While neurologists may treat general neurologic conditions, some neurologists go on to receive additional training focusing on a particular subspecialty in the field of neurology. These training programs are called fellowships, and are one to three years in duration. Subspecialties in the United States include brain injury medicine, clinical neurophysiology, epilepsy, neurodevelopmental disabilities, neuromuscular medicine, pain medicine, sleep medicine, neurocritical care, vascular neurology (stroke), behavioral neurology, headache, neuroimmunology and infectious disease, movement disorders, neuroimaging, neurooncology, and neurorehabilitation.

In Germany, a compulsory year of psychiatry must be done to complete a residency of neurology.

In the United Kingdom and Ireland, neurology is a subspecialty of general (internal) medicine. After five years of medical school and two years as a Foundation Trainee, an aspiring neurologist must pass the examination for Membership of the Royal College of Physicians (or the Irish equivalent) and complete two years of core medical training before entering specialist training in neurology. Up to the 1960s, some intending to become neurologists would also spend two years working in psychiatric units before obtaining a diploma in psychological medicine. However, that was uncommon and, now that the MRCPsych takes three years to obtain, would no longer be practical. A period of research is essential, and obtaining a higher degree aids career progression. Many found it was eased after an attachment to the Institute of Neurology at Queen Square, London. Some neurologists enter the field of rehabilitation medicine (known as physiatry in the US) to specialise in neurological rehabilitation, which may include stroke medicine, as well as traumatic brain injuries.

== Physical examination ==
During a neurological examination, the neurologist reviews the patient's health history with special attention to the patient's neurologic complaints. The patient then takes a neurological exam. Typically, the exam tests mental status, function of the cranial nerves (including vision), strength, coordination, reflexes, sensation and gait. This information helps the neurologist determine whether the problem exists in the nervous system and the clinical localization. Localization of the pathology is the key process by which neurologists develop their differential diagnosis. Further tests may be needed to confirm a diagnosis and ultimately guide therapy and appropriate management. Useful adjunct imaging studies in neurology include CT scanning and magnetic resonance imaging (MRI). Other tests used to assess muscle and nerve function include nerve conduction studies and electromyography.

== Clinical tasks ==
Neurologists examine patients who are referred to them by other physicians in both the inpatient and outpatient settings. Neurologists begin their interactions with patients by taking a comprehensive medical history, and then performing a physical examination focusing on evaluating the nervous system. Components of the neurological examination include assessment of the patient's cognitive function, cranial nerves, motor strength, sensation, reflexes, coordination, and gait.

In some instances, neurologists may order additional diagnostic tests as part of the evaluation. Commonly employed tests in neurology include imaging studies such as computed axial tomography (CAT) scans, magnetic resonance imaging (MRI), and ultrasound of major blood vessels of the head and neck. Neurophysiologic studies, including electroencephalography (EEG), needle electromyography (EMG), nerve conduction studies (NCSs) and evoked potentials are also commonly ordered. Neurologists frequently perform lumbar punctures to assess characteristics of a patient's cerebrospinal fluid. Advances in genetic testing have made genetic testing an important tool in the classification of inherited neuromuscular disease and diagnosis of many other neurogenetic diseases. The role of genetic influences on the development of acquired neurologic diseases is an active area of research.

=== Conditions and treatments ===
Some of the commonly encountered conditions treated by neurologists include headaches, radiculopathy, neuropathy, stroke, dementia, seizures and epilepsy, Alzheimer's disease, attention deficit hyperactivity disorder, Parkinson's disease, Tourette syndrome, multiple sclerosis, head trauma, sleep disorders, neuromuscular diseases, and various infections and tumors of the nervous system. Neurologists are also asked to evaluate unresponsive patients on life support to confirm brain death.

Treatment options vary depending on the neurological problem. They can include referring the patient to a physiotherapist, prescribing medications, or recommending a surgical procedure.

Some neurologists specialize in certain parts of the nervous system or in specific procedures. For example, clinical neurophysiologists specialize in the use of EEG and intraoperative monitoring to diagnose certain neurological disorders. Other neurologists specialize in the use of electrodiagnostic medicine studies – needle EMG and NCSs. In the US, physicians do not typically specialize in all the aspects of clinical neurophysiology – i.e. sleep, EEG, EMG, and NCSs. The American Board of Clinical Neurophysiology certifies US physicians in general clinical neurophysiology, epilepsy, and intraoperative monitoring. The American Board of Electrodiagnostic Medicine certifies US physicians in electrodiagnostic medicine and certifies technologists in nerve-conduction studies. Sleep medicine is a subspecialty field in the US under several medical specialties including anesthesiology, internal medicine, family medicine, and neurology. Neurosurgery is a distinct specialty that involves a different training path and emphasizes the surgical treatment of neurological disorders.

Also, many nonmedical doctors, those with doctoral degrees (usually PhDs) in subjects such as biology and chemistry, study and research the nervous system. Working in laboratories in universities, hospitals, and private companies, these neuroscientists perform clinical and laboratory experiments and tests to learn more about the nervous system and find cures or new treatments for diseases and disorders.

A great deal of overlap occurs between neuroscience and neurology. Many neurologists work in academic training hospitals, where they conduct research as neuroscientists in addition to treating patients and teaching neurology to medical students.

Neurotherapy involves systemic targeted delivery of an energy stimulus to a specific neurological zone or methods that retrain how the brain functions.

=== General responsibilities ===
Neurologists are responsible for the diagnosis, treatment, and management of all the conditions mentioned above. When surgical or endovascular intervention is required, the neurologist may refer the patient to a neurosurgeon or an interventional neuroradiologist. Neurologists frequently care for people with hereditary (genetic) diseases when the major manifestations are neurological, as is frequently the case. Lumbar punctures are frequently performed by neurologists. Some neurologists may develop an interest in particular subfields, such as stroke, dementia, movement disorders, neurointensive care, headaches, epilepsy, sleep disorders, chronic pain management, multiple sclerosis, or neuromuscular diseases.

=== Overlapping areas ===
Some overlap also occurs with other specialties, varying from country to country and even within a local geographic area. Acute head trauma is most often treated by neurosurgeons, whereas sequelae of head trauma may be treated by neurologists or specialists in rehabilitation medicine. Although stroke cases have been traditionally managed by internal medicine or hospitalists, the emergence of vascular neurology and interventional neuroradiology has created a demand for stroke specialists. The establishment of Joint Commission-certified stroke centres has increased the role of neurologists in stroke care in many primary, as well as tertiary, hospitals. Some cases of nervous system infectious diseases are treated by infectious disease specialists. Most cases of headache are diagnosed and treated primarily by general practitioners, at least the less severe cases. Likewise, most cases of sciatica are treated by general practitioners, though they may be referred to neurologists or surgeons (neurosurgeons or orthopedic surgeons). Sleep disorders are also treated by pulmonologists and psychiatrists. Cerebral palsy is initially treated by pediatricians, but care may be transferred to an adult neurologist after the patient reaches a certain age. Physical medicine and rehabilitation physicians may treat patients with neuromuscular diseases with electrodiagnostic studies (needle EMG and nerve-conduction studies) and other diagnostic tools. In the United Kingdom and other countries, many of the conditions encountered by older patients such as movement disorders, including Parkinson's disease, stroke, dementia, or gait disorders, are managed predominantly by specialists in geriatric medicine.

Clinical neuropsychologists are often called upon to evaluate brain-behavior relationships for the purpose of assisting with differential diagnosis, planning rehabilitation strategies, documenting cognitive strengths and weaknesses, and measuring change over time (e.g., for identifying abnormal aging or tracking the progression of a dementia).

=== Relationship to clinical neurophysiology ===
In some countries such as the United States and Germany, neurologists may subspecialize in clinical neurophysiology, the field responsible for EEG and intraoperative monitoring, or in electrodiagnostic medicine nerve conduction studies, EMG, and evoked potentials. In other countries, this is an autonomous specialty (e.g., United Kingdom, Sweden, Spain).

=== Overlap with psychiatry ===
In the past, prior to the advent of more advanced diagnostic techniques such as MRI, some neurologists considered psychiatry and neurology to overlap. Although modern physicians accept that brain chemistry plays a role in mental illness, traditionally they are classified separately from neurological disorders, and treated by psychiatrists. In a 2002 review article in the American Journal of Psychiatry, Professor Joseph B. Martin, Dean of Harvard Medical School and a neurologist by training, wrote, "the separation of the two categories is arbitrary, often influenced by beliefs rather than proven scientific observations. And the fact that the brain and mind are one makes the separation artificial anyway".

Neurological disorders often have psychiatric manifestations, such as post-stroke depression, depression and dementia associated with Parkinson's disease, mood and cognitive dysfunctions in Alzheimer's disease, and Huntington's disease. Hence, the sharp distinction between neurology and psychiatry is not always on a biological basis. The dominance of psychoanalytic theory in the first three-quarters of the 20th century has since then been largely replaced by a focus on pharmacology. Despite the shift to a medical model, neuroscience has not advanced to a point where scientists or clinicians can point to readily discernible pathological lesions or genetic abnormalities that in and of themselves serve as reliable or predictive biomarkers of a given mental disorder.

== Neurological enhancement ==
The emerging field of neurological enhancement highlights the potential of therapies to improve such things as workplace efficacy, attention in school, and overall happiness in personal lives. However, this field has also given rise to questions about neuroethics.

== See also ==
- American Board of Psychiatry and Neurology
- American Osteopathic Board of Neurology and Psychiatry
- Developmental Neurorehabilitation, a peer-reviewed medical journal
- List of neurologists
- List of women neuroscientists
- Neuroepigenetics
- Neurohospitalist, a physician interested in inpatient neurological care
