= Slow vertex response =

The slow vertex response (also called SVR or V potential) is an electrochemical signal associated with electrophysiological recordings of the auditory system, specifically Auditory evoked potentials (AEPs). The SVR of a normal human being recorded with surface electrodes can be found at the end of a recorded AEP waveform between the latencies 50-500ms. Detection of SVR is used to estimate thresholds for hearing pathways.
