= Electrooculography =

Technique

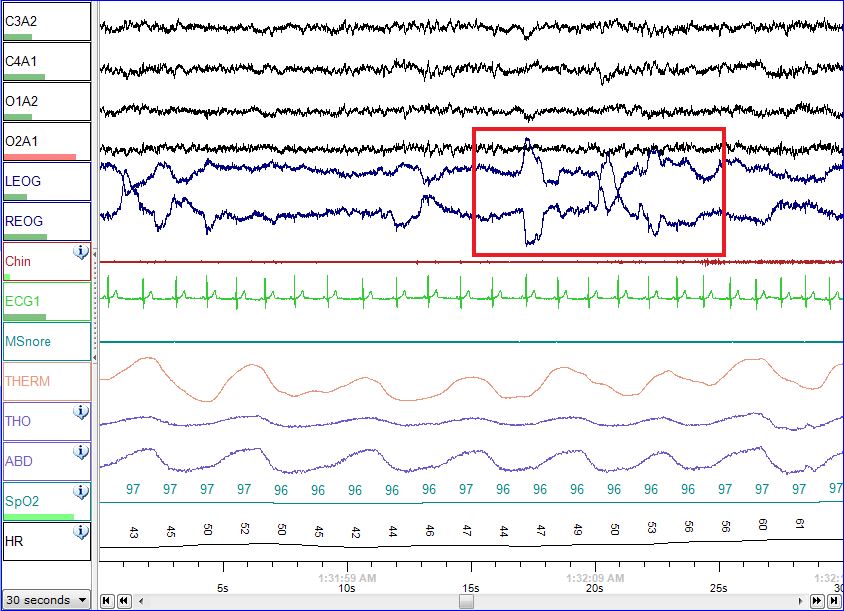
- Electrooculograms for the left eye (LEOG) and the right eye (REOG) for the period of REM sleep.
- ICD-9-CM: 95.22
- MeSH: D004585

Electrooculography (EOG) is a technique for measuring the corneo-retinal standing potential that exists between the front and the back of the human eye. The resulting signal is called the electrooculogram. Primary applications are in ophthalmological diagnosis and in recording eye movements. Unlike the electroretinogram, the EOG does not measure response to individual visual stimuli.

To measure eye movement, pairs of electrodes are typically placed either above and below the eye or to the left and right of the eye. If the eye moves from center position toward one of the two electrodes, this electrode "sees" the positive side of the retina and the opposite electrode "sees" the negative side of the retina. Consequently, a potential difference occurs between the electrodes. Assuming that the resting potential is constant, the recorded potential is a measure of the eye's position.

In 1951 Elwin Marg described and named electrooculogram for a technique of measuring the resting potential of the retina in the human eye.

== Principle ==
The eye acts as a dipole in which the anterior pole is positive and the posterior pole is negative.

1. Left gaze: the cornea approaches the electrode near the outer canthus of the left eye, resulting in a negative-trending change in the recorded potential difference.
2. Right gaze: the cornea approaches the electrode near the inner canthus of the left eye, resulting in a positive-trending change in the recorded potential difference.

== Ophthalmological diagnosis ==
The EOG is used to assess the function of the pigment epithelium. During dark adaptation, resting potential decreases slightly and reaches a minimum ("dark trough") after several minutes. When light is switched on, a substantial increase of the resting potential occurs ("light peak"), which drops off after a few minutes when the retina adapts to the light. The ratio of the voltages (i.e. light peak divided by dark trough) is known as the Arden ratio. In practice, the measurement is similar to eye movement recordings (see above). The patient is asked to switch eye position repeatedly between two points (alternating looking from center to the left and from center to the right). Since these positions are constant, a change in the recorded potential originates from a change in the resting potential.

== See also ==
- International Society for Clinical Electrophysiology of Vision
- Nystagmus
- Optokinetic drum
- Orthoptist
