= International Society for Clinical Electrophysiology of Vision =

The International Society for Clinical Electrophysiology of Vision (ISCEV) is an association that promotes research and applications of electrophysiological methods (e.g. electroretinogram, electrooculogram, and visual evoked potentials) in clinical diagnosis of ophthalmological diseases. The society was founded in 1958 as the International Society for Clinical Electroretinography (ISCERG) and holds annual meetings that take place at changing locations. The official journal is Documenta Ophthalmologica. The society also establishes standards for electrophysiological diagnosis.
