= Sensory gating =

Automatic process by which the brain adjusts to stimuli

Sensory gating describes neural processes of filtering out redundant or irrelevant stimuli from all possible environmental stimuli reaching the brain. Also referred to as gating or filtering, sensory gating prevents an overload of information in the higher-order centers of the brain. Sensory gating can also occur in different forms through changes in both perception and sensation, affected by various factors such as "arousal, recent stimulus exposure, and selective attention."

Although sensory gating is largely automatic, it also occurs within the context of attention processing as the brain selectively seeks for goal-relevant information. Previous studies have shown a correlation between sensory gating and different cognitive functions, but there is not yet a solid evidence implying that the relationship between sensory gating and cognitive functions are modality-independent.

== Cocktail party effect ==
The cocktail party effect illustrates how the brain inhibits input from environmental stimuli, while still processing sensory input from the attended stimulus. The cocktail party effect demonstrates sensory gating in hearing, but the other senses also go through the same process protecting primary cortical areas from being overwhelmed.

== Neural regions involved ==
Information from sensory receptors make their way to the brain through neurons and synapse at the thalamus. The pulvinar nuclei of the thalamus plays a major role in attention, and has a major role in filtering out unnecessary information in regards to sensory gating. In a proven clinical study, it has been found out that the two stimuli (S1 and S2) are transported within 500ms between the clicks and 8 seconds between the pairs, in which S1 is known to generate a trace of memory that lingers presumably in the hippocampal region while the S2 the arrives later to be compared with the first stimuli as it gets inhibited if provided with no new information. (Both S1 and S2 are commonly referred to auditory stimuli caused by the machines used to test sensory gating.) The pulvinar nuclei in the thalamus function as the gatekeeper, deciding which information should be inhibited, and which should be sent to further cortical areas. The CNS (Central Nervous System), after the pulvinar nuclei deems the information to be irrelevant, acts as an essential inhibitory mechanism that prevents the information from flowing into higher cortical centers.

Sensory gating is mediated by a network in the brain which involves the auditory cortex (AC), prefrontal cortex, hippocampus, as well as the olfactory cortex, which plays a part in sensory gating phenomenon. Other areas of the brain associated with sensory gating include the amygdala, striatum, medial prefrontal cortex, and mid-brain dopamine cell region (GABAergic neurons only). Research on sensory gating has been primarily occurring in cortical areas where the stimulus is consciously identified because it is a less invasive means of studying sensory gating. Studies on rats also show the brain stem, thalamus, and primary auditory cortex play a role in sensory gating for auditory stimuli.

== Techniques for measurement ==
=== Paired-click paradigm ===
The paired-click paradigm is a common non-invasive technique used to measure sensory gating, a type of event-related potential. For normal sensory gating, if a person hears a pair of clicks within 500 ms of one another, the person will gate out the second click because it is perceived as being redundant. Evidence of the gating can be seen in the P50 wave, occurring in the brain 50 ms after the click. Low values of the P50 wave indicate that sensory gating has occurred. High values of the P50 wave indicate a lack of sensory gating. Individuals with schizophrenia only reduce the amplitude of S2 by 10–20%, whereas individuals without schizophrenia reduce the amplitude of S2 by 80–90%.

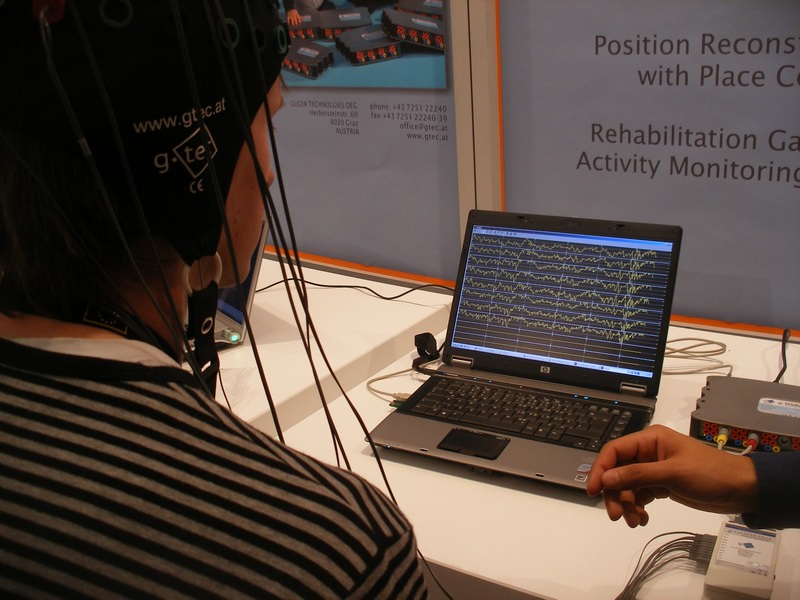
A subject wearing an electroencephalography cap, a conventional technique for measuring one's reactivity using sensory gating.

=== Other techniques ===
Electroencephalography (EEG) and magnetoencephalographies (MEG) are used to measure brain responses and are common techniques for studying sensory gating. One type of EEG measure used for sensory gating research is the event-related potential (ERP). EEG research on sensory gating shows that gating starts almost immediately after receiving a stimulus. Positron emission tomography (PET) studies have shown that an increased need to gate information is accompanied by increased engagement of the thalamus. P50 wave testing is one of many auditory event-related potential studies.

== Sensory gating deficits and mental illness ==
=== Schizophrenia ===
A large interest in sensory gating research is directed at improving deficits among people diagnosed with schizophrenia. People with schizophrenia often have deficits in gating the neuronal response of the P50 wave, which is why P50 is the most widespread method of diagnosis. The test is conducted through having the patients hear two uniform sounds with an interval of 500 milliseconds. While the patients are hearing the sound, an EEG cap is used to measure the brain activity in response to those sounds. A normal subject shows a decrease in brain activity while hearing a second sound, while a subject showing equal brain activity to the first sound is more likely to have schizophrenia. Since people with schizophrenia can often have an overload of attended stimuli, the P50 wave may serve a critical role in illuminating sensory gating at a neurological level.

Currently the test has been conducted on mice, and results have been identical to human subjects in that brain activity has decreased on the second sound. In the second experiment, scientists placed internal electrodes in the auditory regions of the brain. It was found that by the time the second sound occurred, a drop in brain activity had already initiated from the brainstem. The discovery of the filter effect activating as soon as the brainstem perceives a sound was carried out on mice with the "22q11 deletion syndrome," a syndrome associated with schizophrenia in humans. The continuing study, to be verified, suggests that the filter system is indeed in the brainstem, offering hope for finding the neurological source of schizophrenia.

=== Post-Traumatic Stress Disorder (PTSD) ===
Those with PTSD also exhibit impaired sensory gating. Compared to those with Generalized Anxiety Disorder and control groups, those with PTSD show high sensory hyperactivity and impaired sensory disinhibition. Studies on the effect of PTSD on P50 gating have produced mixed results, with some finding a similar pattern to schizophrenia, some finding it was limited to auditory stimulation only, and others finding no effect. Impaired gating of N100 and P200 has also been observed.

== Drug influences ==
=== Nicotine ===
One reason people report they like smoking cigarettes is nicotine's ability to aid their selective attention. The nicotine causes the receptors to release nitric oxide, which slows sensory inhibition causing a suppression of a subsequent stimuli. Due to its effect, nicotine can correct sensory gating deficits for individuals with schizophrenia (80% of individuals with schizophrenia smoke up to 30 cigarettes/day), although the effects only last about 30 minutes since the nicotine receptors desensitize quickly. Some research suggests that the same self-medication is present among those with attention deficit hyperactivity disorder (ADHD) as well as those on the autism spectrum.

== Sensory gating and creativity ==
Some research shows evidence of a connection between sensory gating and creative thinking. One experiment conducted in 2015 suggests that so-called "leaky" attention spans in people with high levels of psychopathology may lead to increased creativity. During the study, the researchers discovered that creative people tend to show reduced sensory gating, filtering out sound less than the normal subjects. Reduced ability to inhibit secondary information caused a wider range of unfiltered stimuli to come through a conscious brain, enabling a creative person to integrate different ideas, rendering creative thinking. The experiment was carried out by 97 participants, whose creativity was measured through recording their achievements and conducting a divergent thinking test. After, sensory gating was measured through both the EEG and auditory clicks. The results proved that people with creative achievements did indeed show a reduced latent inhibition compared to the average subjects. Thus, the study showed evidence of a correlation between creativity and sensory gating with reduced filtering proving to be a mechanism for receiving a larger range of stimuli leading to more creativity.

== See also ==
- Selective attention
- Sensory overload
- Cocktail party effect
- Latent inhibition
- Event-related potential
- P50 (neuroscience)
- Prepulse inhibition
