= Toxic amblyopia =

Medical condition

Toxic amblyopia, or nutritional optic neuropathy, is a condition where a toxic reaction in the optic nerve results in visual loss. Various poisonous substances may cause the condition as well as nutritional factors.

Tobacco amblyopia is a form of toxic amblyopia caused by tobacco containing cyanide. Tobacco amblyopia is marked by a gradual impairment of vision characterised by visual field defects and hindered central vision.

Methyl alcohol amblyopia occurs through acute poisoning by methyl alcohol and may lead to complete blindness.

Since the term toxic amblyopia is a misnomer according to modern definition of amblyopia, it is now more accurately termed as toxic retinopathies or neuropathies.
