= Clinical neurophysiology =

Medical specialty

Clinical neurophysiology is a medical specialty that studies the central and peripheral nervous systems through the recording of bioelectrical activity, whether spontaneous or stimulated. It encompasses both research regarding the pathophysiology along with clinical methods used to diagnose diseases involving both central and peripheral nervous systems. Examinations in the clinical neurophysiology field are not limited to tests conducted in a laboratory. It is thought of as an extension of a neurologic consultation. Tests that are conducted are concerned with measuring the electrical functions of the brain, spinal cord, and nerves in the limbs and muscles. It can give the precise definition of site, the type and degree of the lesion, along with revealing the abnormalities that are in question. Due to these abilities, clinical neurophysiology is used to mainly help diagnose diseases rather than treat them.

In some countries it is a part of neurology or psychiatry, for example the United States and Germany. In other countries it is an autonomous specialty, such as Spain, Portugal, Italy, the United Kingdom, Finland, Sweden and Norway.

Hospitals that have neurologists and neurosurgeons tend to house clinical neurophysiology departments. Usually these tend to be larger hospitals that are able to employ more specialized staff units. In hospitals that possess clinical neurophysiology facilities, the major diagnostic modalities employed include:

- Electromyography and nerve conduction studies: These diagnostic tests of the peripheral nervous system are especially useful in evaluating diseases of the muscles, nerves, and nerve roots. The basis of these tests is recording electrical activity of the muscles and the passage of electric signal along the nerves in the limbs. The disorders of nerve and muscle can either be acute (which means they rather come quickly), or have a slow developing nature. An online tool exists that allows for the interactive exploration of these neurophysiological methods and of the symptoms to which they can be related.
- Electroencephalography: Diagnostic test of thalamocortical rhythms (brain waves), useful in evaluating seizures and various abnormalities of the central nervous system. This is done by hooking up electrodes on the surface of the scalp to record currents from the cerebral cortex.
- Evoked potentials: Diagnostic test evaluating specific tracts of the central and peripheral nervous system. May include visual, auditory, or somatosensory evoked potentials. These record the electrical responses of the brain and spinal cord to the stimulation of the senses.
- Polysomnography: A type of sleep study employed to diagnose disorders associated with abnormal sleep behavior
- Intraoperative monitoring, Intraoperative neurophysiologic monitoring:

== In the United States ==
The pathway to becoming a clinical neurophysiologist in the U.S. includes completing an undergraduate degree, medical school, and postgraduate medical education, usually in neurology. Following the completion of an accredited residency program, clinicians may choose to enter a fellowship in Clinical Neurophysiology. Programs may expose their fellows to the broad spectrum of electrodiagnostic neurophysiologic studies, or may focus on a single area such as EEG or electrodiagnostic medicine. Clinical neurophysiology fellowships are generally 1–2 years in duration and may lead to board certification in one or more subspecialty areas.Within this clinical and academic framework, Phillip L. Pearl plays a significant role as a senior clinician and educator in pediatric clinical neurophysiology at Boston Children's Hospital and Harvard Medical School.

== In the United Kingdom ==
There are two healthcare professionals who typically perform neurophysiological investigations in the UK. These are medical staff trained in clinical neurophysiology, and clinical physiologists who undertake four years of practical training whilst undertaking an honours degree. Physiologists perform the majority of EEGs, evoked potentials and a portion of the nerve conduction studies. They are then clinically reported either by the physiology staff or the medical staff. Their professional organisations are the British Society for Clinical Neurophysiology and the Association of Neurophysiological Scientists

== Relationship to electrodiagnostic medicine ==
Electrodiagnostic medicine is a subset of clinical neurophysiology. Electrodiagnostic medicine focuses only on the peripheral nervous system and not the central nervous system. Whereas a clinical neurophysiologist is trained to perform all the following studies EEG, intraoperative monitoring, nerve conduction studies, EMG and evoked potentials, and electrodiagnostic physician focuses mainly on nerve conduction studies, needle EMG, and evoked potentials. The American Board of Psychiatry and Neurology provides certification examination in clinical neurophysiology. The American Board of Electrodiagnostic Medicine provides certification in EDX medicines. The American Board of Clinical Neurophysiology certifies in electroencephalography (EEG), Evoked Potentials (EP), Polysomnography (PSG), Epilepsy Monitoring, and Neurologic Intraoperative Monitoring (NIOM). In the US physicians typically specialize in EEG or EDX medicine but not both.

== Neurophysiologists in hospitals ==
Hospitals that have neurologists and neurosurgeons tend to house clinical neurophysiology departments. Usually these tend to be larger hospitals that are able to employ more specialized staff units. Clinical neurophysiologists are responsible for analyzing and writing reports on tests that take place within the department. They must also interpret the results that they receive and convey this information to the doctor that referred the patient to the particular neurophysiologist. Many tests involve carrying out an EMG to read the evoked potential recordings. Nerve conduction recordings are extremely common as well.
