= Evoked potential =

Electrical potential evoked in the nervous system

- MeSH: D005071

An evoked potential or evoked response (EV) is an electrical potential in a specific pattern recorded from a specific part of the nervous system, especially the brain, of a human or other animal following presentation of a stimulus such as a light flash or a pure tone. Different types of potentials result from stimuli of different modalities and types. Evoked potential is distinct from spontaneous potentials as detected by electroencephalography (EEG), electromyography (EMG), or other electrophysiologic recording method. Such potentials are useful for electrodiagnosis and monitoring that include detections of disease and drug-related sensory dysfunction and intraoperative monitoring of sensory pathway integrity.

Evoked potential amplitudes tend to be low, ranging from less than a microvolt to several microvolts, compared to tens of microvolts for EEG, millivolts for EMG, and often close to 20 millivolts for ECG. To resolve these low-amplitude potentials against the background of ongoing EEG, ECG, EMG, and other biological signals and ambient noise, signal averaging is usually required. The signal is time-locked to the stimulus and most of the noise occurs randomly, allowing the noise to be averaged out with averaging of repeated responses.

Signals can be recorded from the cerebral cortex, brain stem, spinal cord, peripheral nerves and muscles. Usually the term "evoked potential" is reserved for responses involving either recording from, or stimulation of, central nervous system structures. Thus evoked compound motor action potentials (CMAP) or sensory nerve action potentials (SNAP) as used in nerve conduction studies (NCS) are generally not thought of as evoked potentials, though they do meet the above definition.

Evoked potential is different from event-related potential (ERP), although the terms are sometimes used synonymously, because ERP has higher latency, and is associated with higher cognitive processing. Evoked potentials are mainly classified by the type of stimulus: somatosensory, auditory, visual. But they could also be classified according to stimulus frequency, wave latencies, potential origin, location, and derivation.

== Steady-state evoked potential ==
An evoked potential is the electrical response of the brain to a sensory stimulus. Regan constructed an analogue Fourier series analyzer to record harmonics of the evoked potential of flickering (sinusoidally modulated) light. Rather than integrating the sine and cosine products, Regan fed the signals to a two-pen recorder via lowpass filters. This allowed him to demonstrate that the brain attained a steady-state regime in which the amplitude and phase of the harmonics (frequency components) of the response were approximately constant over time. By analogy with the steady-state response of a resonant circuit that follows the initial transient response he defined an idealized steady-state evoked potential (SSEP) as a form of response to repetitive sensory stimulation in which the constituent frequency components of the response remain constant with time in both amplitude and phase. Although this definition implies a series of identical temporal waveforms, it is more helpful to define the SSEP in terms of the frequency components that are an alternative description of the time-domain waveform, because different frequency components can have quite different properties. For example, the properties of the high-frequency flicker SSEP (whose peak amplitude is near 40–50 Hz) correspond to the properties of the subsequently discovered magnocellular neurons in the retina of the macaque monkey, while the properties of the medium-frequency flicker SSEP (whose amplitude peak is near 15–20 Hz) correspond to the properties of parvocellular neurons. Since a SSEP can be completely described in terms of the amplitude and phase of each frequency component it can be quantified more unequivocally than an averaged transient evoked potential.

It is sometimes said that SSEPs are elicited only by stimuli of high repetition frequency, but this is not generally correct. In principle, a sinusoidally modulated stimulus can elicit a SSEP even when its repetition frequency is low. Because of the high-frequency rolloff of the SSEP, high frequency stimulation can produce a near-sinusoidal SSEP waveform, but this is not germane to the definition of a SSEP. By using zoom-FFT to record SSEPs at the theoretical limit of spectral resolution ΔF (where ΔF in Hz is the reciprocal of the recording duration in seconds) Regan and Regan discovered that the amplitude and phase variability of the SSEP can be sufficiently small that the bandwidth of the SSEP's constituent frequency components can be at the theoretical limit of spectral resolution up to at least a 500-second recording duration (0.002 Hz in this case). Repetitive sensory stimulation elicits a steady-state magnetic brain response that can be analysed in the same way as the SSEP.

=== The "simultaneous stimulation" technique ===
This technique allows several (e.g., four) SSEPs to be recorded simultaneously from any given location on the scalp. Different sites of stimulation or different stimuli can be tagged with slightly different frequencies that are virtually identical to the brain, but easily separated by Fourier series analyzers. For example, when two unpatterned lights are modulated at slightly different frequencies (F1 and F2) and superimposed, multiple nonlinear cross-modulation components of frequency (mF1 ± nF2) are created in the SSEP, where m and n are integers. These components allow nonlinear processing in the brain to be investigated. By frequency-tagging two superimposed gratings, spatial frequency and orientation tuning properties of the brain mechanisms that process spatial form can be isolated and studied. Stimuli of different sensory modalities can also be tagged. For example, a visual stimulus was flickered at Fv Hz and a simultaneously presented auditory tone was amplitude modulated at Fa Hz. The existence of a (2Fv + 2Fa) component in the evoked magnetic brain response demonstrated an audio-visual convergence area in the human brain, and the distribution of this response over the head allowed this brain area to be localized. More recently, frequency tagging has been extended from studies of sensory processing to studies of selective attention and of consciousness.

=== The "sweep" technique ===
The sweep technique is a hybrid frequency domain/time domain technique. A plot of, for example, response amplitude versus the check size of a stimulus checkerboard pattern plot can be obtained in 10 seconds, far faster than when time-domain averaging is used to record an evoked potential for each of several check sizes. In the original demonstration of the technique the sine and cosine products were fed through lowpass filters (as when recording a SSEP ) while viewing a pattern of fine checks whose black and white squares exchanged place six times per second. Then the size of the squares was progressively increased so as to give a plot of evoked potential amplitude versus check size (hence "sweep"). Subsequent authors have implemented the sweep technique by using computer software to increment the spatial frequency of a grating in a series of small steps and to compute a time-domain average for each discrete spatial frequency. A single sweep may be adequate or it may be necessary to average the graphs obtained in several sweeps with the averager triggered by the sweep cycle. Averaging 16 sweeps can improve the signal-to-noise ratio of the graph by a factor of four. The sweep technique has proved useful in measuring rapidly adapting visual processes and also for recording from babies, where recording duration is necessarily short. Norcia and Tyler have used the technique to document the development of visual acuity and contrast sensitivity through the first years of life. They have emphasized that, in diagnosing abnormal visual development, the more precise the developmental norms, the more sharply can the abnormal be distinguished from the normal, and to that end have documented normal visual development in a large group of infants. For many years the sweep technique has been used in paediatric ophthalmology (electrodiagnosis) clinics worldwide.

=== Evoked potential feedback ===
This technique allows the SSEP to directly control the stimulus that elicits the SSEP without the conscious intervention of the experimental subject. For example, the running average of the SSEP can be arranged to increase the luminance of a checkerboard stimulus if the amplitude of the SSEP falls below some predetermined value, and to decrease luminance if it rises above this value. The amplitude of the SSEP then hovers about this predetermined value. Now the wavelength (colour) of the stimulus is progressively changed. The resulting plot of stimulus luminance versus wavelength is a plot of the spectral sensitivity of the visual system.

== Sensory evoked potentials ==
Sensory evoked potentials (SEP) are recorded from the central nervous system following stimulation of sense organs, for example, visual evoked potentials elicited by a flashing light or changing pattern on a monitor, auditory evoked potentials by a click or tone stimulus presented through earphones), or tactile or somatosensory evoked potential (SSEP) elicited by tactile or electrical stimulation of a sensory or mixed nerve in the periphery. Sensory evoked potentials have been widely used in clinical diagnostic medicine since the 1970s, and also in intraoperative neurophysiology monitoring (IONM), also known as surgical neurophysiology.

There are three kinds of evoked potentials in widespread clinical use: auditory evoked potentials, usually recorded from the scalp but originating at brainstem level; visual evoked potentials, and somatosensory evoked potentials, which are elicited by electrical stimulation of peripheral nerve. Examples of SEP usage include:

- SSEP can be used to locate lesions such as peripheral nerve or spinal cord.
- VEP and BAEP can supplement neuroimaging as part of workups to diagnose diseases such as multiple sclerosis.
- Short latency EPs such as SSEP, VEP, and BAEP can be used to indicate prognosis for traumatic and anoxic brain injury. Early after anoxic brain injury, no response indicates mortality accurately. In traumatic brain injury, abnormal responses indicates failure to recover from coma. In both types of injury, normal responses may indicate good outcome. Moreover, recovery in responses often indicates clinical recovery.

Long and Allen were the first investigators to report the abnormal brainstem auditory evoked potentials (BAEPs) in an alcoholic woman who recovered from acquired central hypoventilation syndrome. These investigators hypothesized that their patient's brainstem was poisoned, but not destroyed, by her chronic alcoholism.

=== Visual evoked potential ===
Visual evoked potential (VEP or EVP or EVR) is an evoked potential elicited by presenting light flash or pattern stimulus which can be used to confirm damage to visual pathway including retina, optic nerve, optic chiasm, optic radiations, and occipital cortex. One application is in measuring infant's visual acuity. Electrodes are placed on infant's head over visual cortex and a gray field is presented alternately with a checkerboard or grating pattern. If the checker's boxes or stripes are large enough to be detected, VEP is generated; otherwise, none is generated. It's an objective way to measure infant's visual acuity.

VEP can be sensitive to visual dysfunctions that may not be found with just physical examinations or MRI, even if it cannot indicate etiologies. VEP may be abnormal in optic neuritis, optic neuropathy, demyelinating disease, multiple sclerosis, Friedreich’s ataxia, vitamin B_{12} deficiency, neurosyphilis, migraine, ischemic disease, tumor compressing the optic nerve, ocular hypertension, glaucoma, diabetes, toxic amblyopia, aluminum neurotoxicity, manganese intoxication, retrobulbar neuritis, and brain injury. It can be used to examine infant's visual impairment for abnormal visual pathways which may be due to delayed maturation.

The P100 component of VEP response, which is the positive peak with the delay about 100 ms, has a major clinical importance. The visual pathway dysfunction anterior to the optic chiasm maybe where VEPs are most useful. For example, patients with acute severe optic neuritis often lose the P100 response or have highly attenuated responses. Clinical recovery and visual improvement come with P100 restoration but with an abnormal increased latency that continues indefinitely, and hence, it maybe useful as an indicator of previous or subclinical optic neuritis.

In 1934, Adrian and Matthew noticed potential changes of the occipital EEG can be observed under stimulation of light. Ciganek developed the first nomenclature for occipital EEG components in 1961. During that same year, Hirsch and colleagues recorded a visual evoked potential (VEP) on the occipital lobe (externally and internally), and they discovered amplitudes recorded along the calcarine fissure were the largest. In 1965, Spehlmann used a checkerboard stimulation to describe human VEPs. An attempt to localize structures in the primary visual pathway was completed by Szikla and colleagues. Halliday and colleagues completed the first clinical investigations using VEP by recording delayed VEPs in a patient with retrobulbar neuritis in 1972. A wide variety of extensive research to improve procedures and theories has been conducted from the 1970s to today and the method has also been described in animals.

==== VEP Stimuli ====
The diffuse-light flash stimulus is rarely used nowadays due to the high variability within and across subjects. However, it is beneficial to use this type of stimulus when testing infants, animals or individuals with poor visual acuity. The checkerboard and grating patterns use light and dark squares and stripes, respectively. These squares and stripes are equal in size and are presented, one image at a time, via a computer screen.

==== VEP Electrode Placement ====
Electrode placement is extremely important to elicit a good VEP response free of artifact. In a typical (one channel) setup, one electrode is placed 2.5 cm above the inion and a reference electrode is placed at Fz. For a more detailed response, two additional electrodes can be placed 2.5 cm to the right and left of Oz.

==== VEP Waves ====
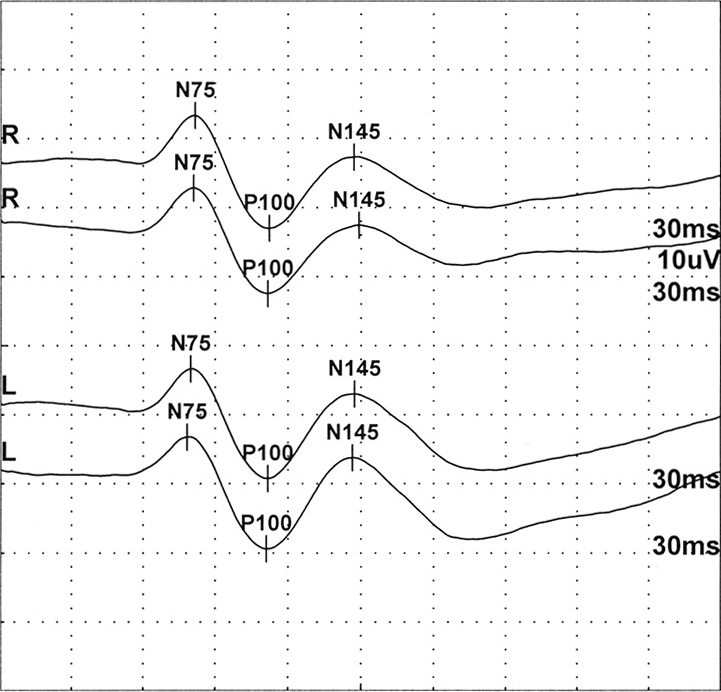
Normal visual evoked potential

The VEP nomenclature is determined by using capital letters stating whether the peak is positive (P) or negative (N) followed by a number which indicates the average peak latency for that particular wave. For example, P100 is a wave with a positive peak at approximately 100 ms following stimulus onset. The average amplitude for VEP waves usually falls between 5 and 20 microvolts.

Normal values are depending on used stimulation hardware (flash stimulus vs. cathode-ray tube or liquid-crystal display, checkerboard field size, etc.).

==== Types of VEP ====
Some specific VEPs are:

- Monocular pattern reversal (most common)
- Sweep visual evoked potential
- Binocular visual evoked potential
- Chromatic visual evoked potential
- Hemi-field visual evoked potential
- Flash visual evoked potential
- LED Goggle visual evoked potential
- Motion visual evoked potential
- Multifocal visual evoked potential
- Multi-channel visual evoked potential
- Multi-frequency visual evoked potential
- Stereo-elicited visual evoked potential
- Steady state visually evoked potential

=== Auditory evoked potential ===
Auditory evoked potentials (AEP) can be used to trace the signal generated by a sound through the ascending auditory pathway. The evoked potential is generated in the cochlea, goes through the cochlear nerve, through the cochlear nucleus, superior olivary complex, lateral lemniscus, to the inferior colliculus in the midbrain, on to the medial geniculate body, and finally to the cortex.

Auditory evoked potentials (AEPs) are a subclass of event-related potentials (ERPs). ERPs are brain responses that are time-locked to some "event", such as a sensory stimulus, a mental event (such as recognition of a target stimulus), or the omission of a stimulus. For AEPs, the "event" is a sound. AEPs (and ERPs) are very small electrical voltage potentials originating from the brain recorded from the scalp in response to an auditory stimulus, such as different tones, speech sounds, etc.

Brainstem auditory evoked potentials are small AEPs that are recorded in response to an auditory stimulus from electrodes placed on the scalp.

AEPs serve for assessment of the functioning of the auditory system and neuroplasticity. They can be used to diagnose learning disabilities in children, aiding in the development of tailored educational programs for those with hearing and or cognition problems.

=== Somatosensory evoked potential ===
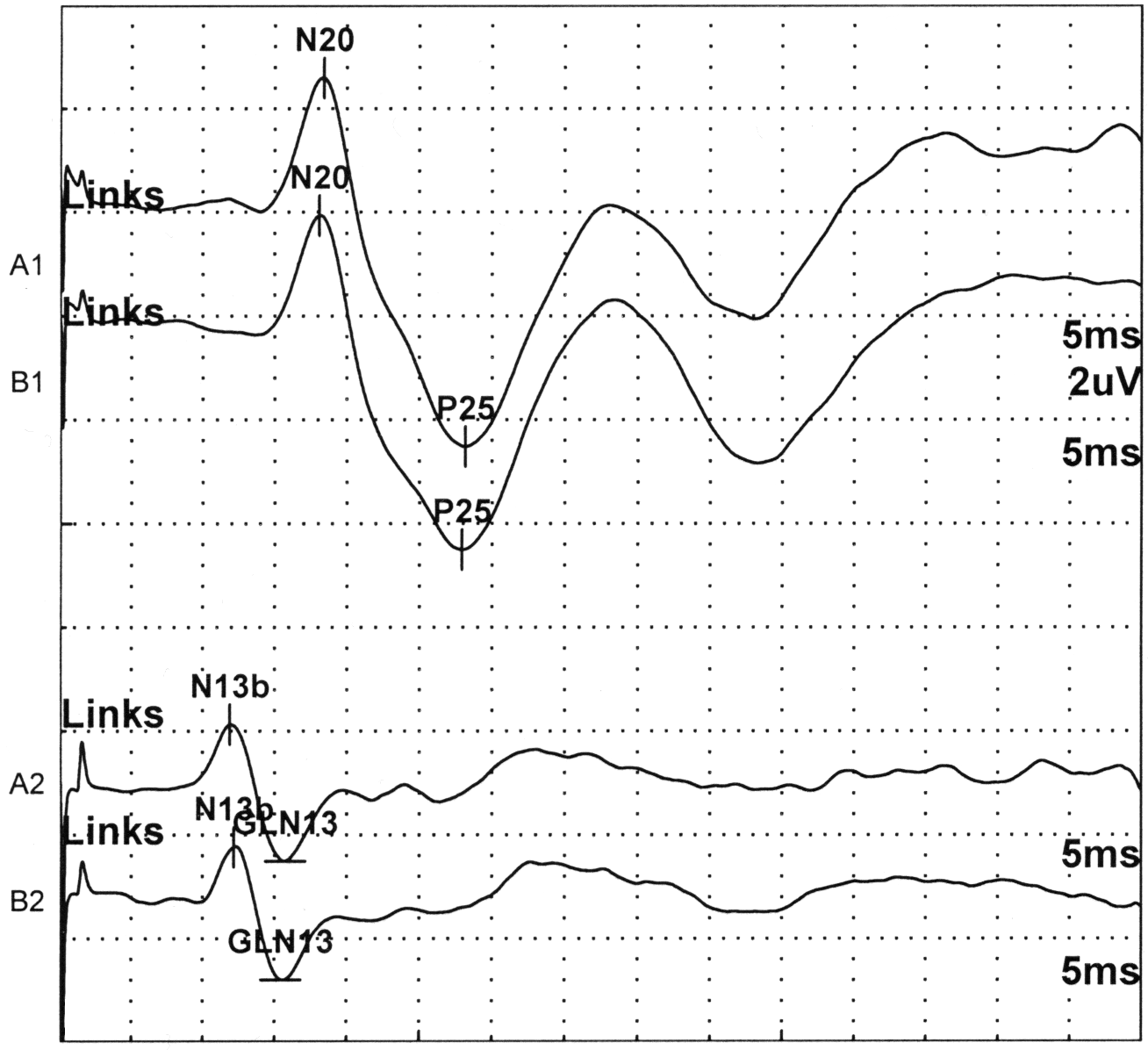
Normal somatosensory evoked potential (tibial nerve)

Somatosensory evoked potentials (SSEPs) are EP recorded from the brain or spinal cord when stimulating peripheral nerve repeatedly. SSEPs are used in neuromonitoring to assess the function of a patient's spinal cord during surgery. They are recorded by stimulating peripheral nerves, most commonly the tibial nerve, median nerve or ulnar nerve, typically with an electrical stimulus. The response is then recorded from the patient's scalp.

Although stimuli such as touch, vibration, and pain can be used for SSEP, electrical stimuli are most common because of ease and reliability. SSEP can be used for prognosis in patients with severe traumatic head injury. Because SSEP with latency less than 50 ms is relatively independent of consciousness, if used early in comatose patient, it can predict outcome reliably and efficiently. For example, comatose patients with no responses bilaterally has 95% chance of not recovering from coma. But care should be taken analyzing the result. For example, increased sedation and other CNS injuries such as the spinal cord can affect SEP.

Because of the low amplitude of the signal once it reaches the patient's scalp and the relatively high amount of electrical noise caused by background EEG, scalp muscle EMG or electrical devices in the room, the signal must be averaged. The use of averaging improves the signal-to-noise ratio. Typically, in the operating room, over 100 and up to 1,000 averages must be used to adequately resolve the evoked potential.

The two most looked at aspects of an SSEP are the amplitude and latency of the peaks. The most predominant peaks have been studied and named in labs. Each peak is given a letter and a number in its name. For example, N20 refers to a negative peak (N) at 20ms. This peak is recorded from the cortex when the median nerve is stimulated. It most likely corresponds to the signal reaching the somatosensory cortex. When used in intraoperative monitoring, the latency and amplitude of the peak relative to the patient's post-intubation baseline is a crucial piece of information. Dramatic increases in latency or decreases in amplitude are indicators of neurological dysfunction.

During surgery, the large amounts of anesthetic gases used can affect the amplitude and latencies of SSEPs. Any of the halogenated agents or nitrous oxide will increase latencies and decrease amplitudes of responses, sometimes to the point where a response can no longer be detected. For this reason, an anesthetic utilizing less halogenated agent and more intravenous hypnotic and narcotic is typically used.

==== Clinical Uses ====
SEP findings do not by themselves lead to a specific diagnosis, and organic diseases cannot necessarily be excluded with normal SEP findings. Findings must be interpreted in the context of the patient’s clinical presentation. Evaluating the peripheral responses with SEPs could contribute to the diagnosis of peripheral nerve damage.

Furthermore, SEPs could be abnormal in different pathologies such as multiple sclerosis (MS), hereditary spinocerebellar degenerations, hereditary spastic paraplegia, AIDS and vitamin B_{12} or vitamin E deficiency. In patients with MS, evoked potential findings often complement findings on MRI.

In the acute stage after a traumatic spinal injury or brain trauma, the absence of SEP responses do not correlate with prognosis. However, an early return to normal or preserved cortical responses in the subacute stage correlate with a positive outcome.

SEPs can evaluate subcortical and cortical function in comatose patients and are less sensitive to sedative drugs than EEG. SEP´s and BAEP´s together are tools to assist in the confirmation of brain death in comatose patients

==== Clinical consideration in children ====
As in the adult, SEP findings in combination with the clinical assessment and EEG findings can contribute to the determination of prognosis in comatose children. In high risk newborns, tracking SEP findings over time can be helpful for outcome prognostication. Several neurodegenerative disorders have abnormal findings in spinal and cortical SEP components. Moreover, compressive lesions on the spine (e.g. Arnold-Chiari malformation or mucopolysaccharidosis) are associated with abnormal SEPs, which may precede abnormalities on MRI.

==== Laser evoked potential ====
Conventional SSEPs monitor the functioning of the part of the somatosensory system involved in sensations such as touch and vibration. The part of the somatosensory system that transmits pain and temperature signals is monitored using laser evoked potentials (LEP). LEPs are evoked by applying finely focused, rapidly rising heat to bare skin using a laser. In the central nervous system they can detect damage to the spinothalamic tract, lateral brain stem, and fibers carrying pain and temperature signals from the thalamus to the cortex. In the peripheral nervous system pain and heat signals are carried along thin (C and A delta) fibers to the spinal cord, and LEPs can be used to determine whether a neuropathy is located in these small fibers as opposed to larger (touch, vibration) fibers.

== Motor evoked potentials ==
Motor evoked potentials (MEP) are recorded from muscles following direct stimulation of exposed motor cortex, or transcranial stimulation of motor cortex, either magnetic or electrical. Transcranial magnetic MEP (TCmMEP) potentially offer clinical diagnostic applications. Transcranial electrical MEP (TCeMEP) has been in widespread use for several years for intraoperative monitoring of pyramidal tract functional integrity.

During the 1990s, there were attempts to monitor "motor evoked potentials", including "neurogenic motor evoked potentials" recorded from peripheral nerves, following direct electrical stimulation of the spinal cord. It has become clear that these "motor" potentials were almost entirely elicited by antidromic stimulation of sensory tracts—even when the recording was from muscles (antidromic sensory tract stimulation triggers myogenic responses through synapses at the root entry level). TCMEP, whether electrical or magnetic, is the most practical way to ensure pure motor responses, since stimulation of sensory cortex cannot result in descending impulses beyond the first synapse (synapses cannot be backfired).

TMS-induced MEPs have been used in many experiments in cognitive neuroscience. Because MEP amplitude is correlated with motor excitability, they offer a quantitative way to test the role of various types of intervention on the motor system (pharmacological, behavioral, lesion, etc.). TMS-induced MEPs may thus serve as an index of covert motor preparation or facilitation, e.g., induced by the mirror neuron system when seeing someone's else actions. In addition, MEPs are used as a reference to adjust the intensity of stimulation that needs to be delivered by TMS when targeting cortical regions whose response might not be as easily measurable, e.g., in the context of TMS-based therapy.

== Intraoperative monitoring ==
Somatosensory evoked potentials provide monitoring for the dorsal columns of the spinal cord. Sensory evoked potentials may also be used during surgeries which place brain structures at risk. They are effectively used to determine cortical ischemia during carotid endarterectomy surgeries and for mapping the sensory areas of the brain during brain surgery.

Electrical stimulation of the scalp can produce an electric current within the brain that activates the motor pathways of the pyramidal tracts. This technique is known as transcranial electrical motor potential (TcMEP) monitoring. This technique effectively evaluates the motor pathways in the central nervous system during surgeries which place these structures at risk. These motor pathways, including the lateral corticospinal tract, are located in the lateral and ventral funiculi of the spinal cord. Since the ventral and dorsal spinal cord have separate blood supply with very limited collateral flow, an anterior cord syndrome (paralysis or paresis with some preserved sensory function) is a possible surgical sequela, so it is important to have monitoring specific to the motor tracts as well as dorsal column monitoring.

Transcranial magnetic stimulation versus electrical stimulation is generally regarded as unsuitable for intraoperative monitoring because it is more sensitive to anesthesia. Electrical stimulation is too painful for clinical use in awake patients. The two modalities are thus complementary, electrical stimulation being the choice for intraoperative monitoring, and magnetic for clinical applications.

== See also ==
- Bereitschaftspotential
- Contingent negative variation
- Difference due to memory
- Early left anterior negativity
- Error-related negativity
- Event-related potential
- Evoked field
- Electroencephalography
- Electroretinography
- Slow vertex response
- Event-related potential
  - N100, N200, N2pc, N170, N400, Visual N1
  - C1 and P1, P200, P300, P3a, P3b, P600 (neuroscience)
- International Society for Clinical Electrophysiology of Vision
- Late positive component
- Lateralized readiness potential
- Mismatch negativity
- Neural oscillation
- Oddball paradigm
- Somatosensory evoked potential
