= Alan Mackay-Sim =

Australian biomedical scientist (1951–2023)

Alan Mackay-Sim AM
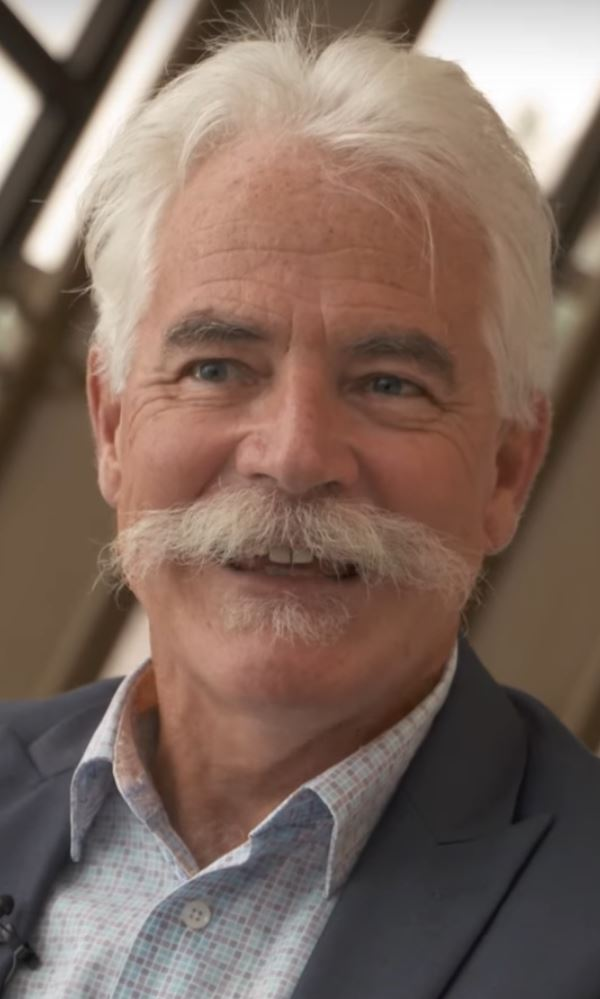
- Mackay-Sim in 2017
- Born: 16 May 1951; Wahroonga, New South Wales, Australia
- Died: 4 January 2023 (aged 71)
- Education: Macquarie University
- Awards: Australian of the Year (2017)
- Scientific career
- Fields: Biomedical science
- Workplaces: Griffith University
- Thesis: Odorous communication by stressed rats (1978)

Alan Mackay-Sim AM (16 May 1951 – 4 January 2023) was an Australian biomedical scientist specialising in adult stem cell research, and winner of the 2017 Australian of the Year. Some of his research focused on olfactory ensheathing cells, which are cells in the human nose that interact with the nervous system to cause a sense of smell.

His research into stem cells contributed to the treatment of spinal cord injuries. The restoration of mobility to Darek Fidyka, a Polish paraplegic man, used research by Mackay-Sim.

== Academic and professional life ==
He began his studies at Macquarie University, where he received a Bachelor of Arts in 1973, an Honours degree in 1974, and a PhD in 1980. His doctoral thesis was titled "Olfaction and stress in mice."

After completing his studies, Mackay-Sim conducted research and taught at the University of Pennsylvania and the University of Wyoming in the United States. In 1987, he returned to Australia and joined Griffith University, where he focused his research on the olfactory system and adult stem cells.

He served as the founding Director of the National Centre for Adult Stem Cell Research and as Deputy Director of the Eskitis Institute for Cell and Molecular Therapies..

.

== Personal life ==
Mackay-Sim was born on 16 May 1951. He grew up in Roseville, New South Wales, the third of four brothers. He attended North Sydney Boys High School.

Mackay-Sim was married, with two children.

In 2015, he was diagnosed with multiple myeloma, and was treated with stem cell transplant.

Mackay-Sim retired in 2015, and lived in Currimundi, Queensland. He died on 4 January 2023, at the age of 71.

== Awards ==
- Member of the Order of Australia, for "significant service to tertiary education, and to biomedical science", in the 2021 Queen's Birthday Honours.
- Australian of the Year, 2017
- Queenslander of the Year, 2003
- Neil Hamilton Fairley Medal, 2018
- Australasian Neuroscience Society Distinguished Achievement Award, 2017
- Eureka Science Prize, 2011
