= Pavel Tabakov =

Pavel Tabakov may refer to:

- Pavel Tabakov (actor) (born 1995), Russian actor
- Pavel Ivanov Tabakov, birth name of Pawel Tabakow (born 1975), Polish neurosurgeon
- Pavel Tabakov (footballer) (born 1970), Russian football player
- Pavlo Tabakov (born 1978), Ukrainian musician and singer

== See also ==
- Tabakov
