= Rehabilitation in spinal cord injury =

When treating a person with a spinal cord injury, repairing the damage created by injury is the ultimate goal. By using a variety of treatments, greater improvements are achieved, and, therefore, treatment should not be limited to one method. Furthermore, increasing activity will increase his/her chances of recovery.

== Acute recovery ==
The rehabilitation process following a spinal cord injury typically begins in the acute care setting. Occupational therapy plays an important role in the management of SCI. Recent studies emphasize the importance of early occupational therapy, started immediately after the client is stable. This process includes teaching of coping skills, and physical therapy. Physical therapists, occupational therapists, social workers, psychologists and other health care professionals typically work as a team under the coordination of a physiatrist to decide on goals with the patient and develop a plan of discharge that is appropriate for the patient's condition. In the first step, the focus is on support and prevention. Interventions aim to give the individual a sense of control over a situation in which the patient likely feels little independence.

As the patient becomes more stable, they may move to a rehabilitation facility or remain in the acute care setting. The patient begins to take more of an active role in their rehabilitation at this stage and works with the team to develop reasonable functional goals.

=== Respiration ===
In the acute phase physical and occupational therapists focus on the patient's respiratory status, prevention of indirect complications (such as pressure sores), maintaining range of motion, and keeping available musculature active.

Depending on the Neurological Level of Impairment (NLI), the muscles responsible for expanding the thorax, which facilitate inhalation, may be affected. If the NLI is such that it affects some of the ventilatory muscles, more emphasis will then be placed on the muscles with intact function. For example, the intercostal muscles receive their innervation from T1–T11, and if any are damaged, more emphasis will need to be placed on the unaffected muscles which are innervated from higher levels of the CNS. As SCI patients have reduced total lung capacity and tidal volume it is pertinent that physical therapists teach SCI patients accessory breathing techniques (e.g. apical breathing, glossopharyngeal breathing, etc.) that typically are not taught to healthy individuals.

=== Functional electrical stimulation ===
Physical therapists can assist immobilized patients with effective cough techniques, secretion clearance, stretching of the thoracic wall, and suggest abdominal support belts when necessary. The amount of time a patient is immobilized may depend on the level of the spinal cord injury. Physical therapists work with the patient to prevent any complications that may arise due to this immobilization. Other complications that arise from immobilization include muscle atrophy and osteoporosis, especially to the lower limbs, increasing the risk of fractures to the femur and tibia. While passive weight bearing of paralyzed lower extremities appears to be ineffective, stressing the bones through muscular contractions initiated by functional electrical stimulation (FES) has yielded positive results in some cases. The intensity, frequency, and duration of stress to the bones appear to be important determinants of improved bone parameters. Generally, the frequency is effective with three or more weekly exercise sessions. Studies of duration suggest that several months to one or more years of FES are necessary.

=== Improving locomotor function ===
Improvement of locomotor function is one of the primary goals for people with a spinal cord injury. SCI treatments may focus on specific goals such as to restore walking or locomotion to an optimal level for the individual. The most effective way to restore locomotion is by complete repair, but techniques are not yet developed for regeneration. Treadmill training, over groundtraining, and functional electrical stimulation can all be used to improve walking or locomotor activity. These activities work if neurons of the central pattern generator (CPG) circuits, which generate rhythmic movements of the body, are still functioning. With inactivity, the neurons of CPG degenerate. Therefore, the above activities are important for keeping neurons active until regeneration activities are developed. A 2012 systematic review found insufficient evidence to conclude which locomotor training strategy improves walking function most for people with spinal cord injury. This suggests that it is not the type of training used, but the goals and the routines that have the biggest impact. Applying spinal cord stimulation (transcutaneous or epidurally) during weight supported walking have been shown to improve locomotor output.

=== Provision ===
In the English NHS a serious shortage of specialist beds was identified by a review in December 2016. There were 393 and 54 additional beds were required. Patients waited an average of 52 days for a bed on a specialist ward in 2015–16. This meant patients were "inappropriately" occupying beds at major trauma centres. It was suggested that NHS England's specialised commissioning division would be unable to fund the recommendations. According to the Spinal Injuries Association, of 2,494 referrals in 2017–18 to specialist spinal cord injury centres, only 800 were admitted and many more patients were not referred at all.

== Post-discharge rehabilitation therapy ==
Though rehabilitation interventions are performed during the acute phase, recent literature suggests that 44% of the total hours spent on rehabilitation during the first year after spinal cord injury, occur after discharge from inpatient rehabilitation. Participants in this study received 56% of their total physical therapy hours and 52% of their total occupational therapy hours after discharge. This suggests that inpatient rehabilitation lengths of stay are reduced and that post-discharge therapy may replace some of the inpatient treatment.

=== Functional independence ===
Whether patients are placed in inpatient rehabilitation or discharged, occupational therapists attempt to maximize functional independence at this stage. Depending on the level of the spinal cord injury, whatever sparing the patient has is optimized. Bed mobility, transfers, wheelchair mobility skills, and performing other activities of daily living (ADLs) are just a few of the interventions that occupational therapists can help the patient with. A major problem for spinal cord injury patients is restricted range of motion. Massage therapy has been used to aid in range of motion rehabilitation. Literature has shown that participants with spinal cord injuries that had massage therapy added into their rehabilitation had significant improvement observed by physical therapist in functional living activities and limb range of motion. This could be due to the decrease in H-Reflex amplitudes measured by EMG that is critical for the comfort of spinal cord injury patients for reducing cramps and spasms.

ADLs can be difficult for an individual with a spinal cord injury; however, through the rehabilitation process, individuals with SCI may be able to live independently in the community with or without full-time attendant care, depending on the level of their injury.

Further interventions focus on support and education for the individual and caregivers. This includes an evaluation of limb function to determine what the patient is capable of doing independently, and teaching the patient self-care skills. Independence in daily activities like eating, bowel and bladder management, and mobility is the goal, as obtaining competency in self-care tasks contributes significantly to an individual's sense of self-confidence and reduces the burden on caregivers. Quality of life issues such as sexual health and function after spinal cord injury are also addressed.

==== Assistive devices ====
Assistive devices such as wheelchairs have a substantial effect on the quality of life of the patient, and careful selection is important. Teaching the patient how to transfer from different positions, such as from a wheelchair into bed, is an important part of therapy, and devices such as sliding transfer boards and grab bars can assist in these tasks. Individuals who are able to transfer independently from their wheelchair to the driver's seat using a sliding transfer board may be able to return to driving in an adapted vehicle. Complete independence with driving also requires the ability to load and unload one's wheelchair from the vehicle. In addition to acquiring skills such as wheelchair transfers, individuals with a spinal cord injury can greatly benefit from exercise reconditioning. In the majority of cases, spinal cord injury leaves the lower limbs either entirely paralyzed, or with insufficient strength, endurance, or motor control to support safe and effective physical training. Therefore, most exercise training employs the use of arm crank ergometry, wheelchair ergometry, and swimming. In one study, subjects with traumatic spinal cord injury participated in a progressive exercise training program, which involved arm ergometry and resistance training. Subjects in the exercise group experienced significant increases in strength for almost all muscle groups when compared to the control group. Exercisers also reported less stress, fewer depressive symptoms, greater satisfaction with physical functioning, less pain, and better quality of life. Physical therapists are able to provide a variety of exercise interventions, including, passive range of motion exercises, upper body wheeling (arm crank ergometry), functional electrical stimulation, and electrically stimulated resistance exercises all of which can improve arterial function in those living with SCI. Physical therapists can improve the quality of life of individuals with spinal cord injury by developing exercise programs that are tailored to meet individual patient needs. Adapted physical activity equipment can also be used to allow for sport participation: for example, sit-skiis can be used by individuals with a spinal cord injury for cross-country or downhill skiing.

The patient's living environment can also be modified to improve independence. For example, ramps or lifts can be added to a patient's home, and part of rehabilitation involves investigating options for returning to previous interests as well as developing new pursuits. Community participation is an important aspect in maintaining quality of life.

== Gait training ==
Body weight supported treadmill training is another intervention that physiotherapists may assist with. Body weight supported treadmill training has been researched in an attempt to prevent bone loss in the lower extremities in individuals with spinal cord injury. Research has shown that early weight-bearing after acute spinal cord injury by standing or treadmill walking (5 times weekly for 25 weeks) resulted in no loss or only moderate loss in trabecular bone compared with immobilized subjects who lost 7-9% of trabecular bone at the tibia. Gait training with body weight support, among patients with incomplete spinal cord injuries, has also recently been shown to be more effective than conventional physiotherapy for improving the spatial-temporal and kinematic gait parameters.

A combination of Body weight supported treadmill training (BWSTT) and robotic-assisted BWSTT is being implemented into some training programs. The benefits include: (1) assist in reproducing leg movements and optimizing gait pattern (speed, step length, amplitude); (2) training sessions can be prolonged and walking speed can be adjusted, increasing motor outcome; (3) provides consistency of movement, where manual interventions/cues by a trainer may be variable (although a trainer should analyze the gait pattern and outcome measures of the training and supervise training). The patient must be an active participant during the robotic movements and try to move with the robot. This type of training would be implemented during the beginning of rehabilitation and progressed to independent locomotion as improvements are made. However, robotic-assisted BWSTT is expensive and often not affordable by physiotherapy clinics. As an alternative, the development of non-motorized exoskeletons are currently being investigated for patients with incomplete SCI. The development of the exoskeleton locomotor device would provide an inexpensive alternative to the robotic devices. The exoskeleton may be used in areas that can not afford robotic devices, or, in areas that can not provide adequate physiotherapy care.

Restorative neurology offers a different paradigm of treating spinal cord injury by focusing on the residual remaining motor control and on the intrinsic function of the sub-lesional spinal cord segments. One study has shown that rTMS can lead to a functional increase in patients with incomplete spinal cord injuries after the effects of BWSTT stagnate.

== See also ==
- Spinal cord injury research
