= Regeneration in humans =

Regrowth of lost tissues or organs

Regeneration in humans refers to the restoration and sometimes limited regrowth of tissue following injury or as part of natural body processes. This is in contrast to wound healing, which involves closing up the injury site with some gradation of scar tissue. Some tissues such as skin, the vas deferens, and large organs including the liver can regrow quite readily, while others have been thought to have little or no capacity for regeneration following an injury.

Numerous tissues and organs have been induced to regenerate. Bladders have been 3D-printed in the lab since 1999. Skin tissue can be regenerated in vivo or in vitro. Other organs and body parts that have been procured to regenerate include: penis, fats, vagina, brain tissue, thymus, and a scaled down human heart. One goal of scientists is to induce full regeneration in more human organs.

There are various techniques that can induce regeneration. By 2016, regeneration of tissue had been induced and operationalized by science. There are four main techniques: regeneration by instrument; regeneration by materials; regeneration by drugs and regeneration by in vitro 3D printing.

== History of human tissue ==
In humans with non-injured tissues, the tissue naturally regenerates over time; by default, new available cells replace expended cells. For example, the body regenerates a full bone within ten years, while non-injured skin tissue is regenerated within two weeks. With injured tissue, the body usually has a different response. This emergency response usually involves building a degree of scar tissue over a time period longer than a regenerative response, as has been proven clinically and via observation. There are many more historical and nuanced understandings about regeneration processes. In full thickness wounds that are under 2 mm, regeneration generally occurs before scarring. In 2008, in full thickness wounds over 3 mm, it was found that a wound needed a material inserted in order to induce full tissue regeneration.

Whereas third degree burns heal slowly by scarring, in 2016 it was known that full thickness fractional photothermolysis holes heal without scarring. Up to 40% of full thickness skin can be removed without scarring in an area, in a fractional pattern via coring of tissue.

Some human organs and tissues regenerate rather than simply scar, as a result of injury. These include the liver, fingertips, and endometrium. More information is now known regarding the passive replacement of tissues in the human body, as well as the mechanics of stem cells. Advances in research have enabled the induced regeneration of many more tissues and organs than previously thought possible. The aim for these techniques is to use these techniques in the near future for the purpose of regenerating any tissue type in the human body.

== Regeneration techniques ==
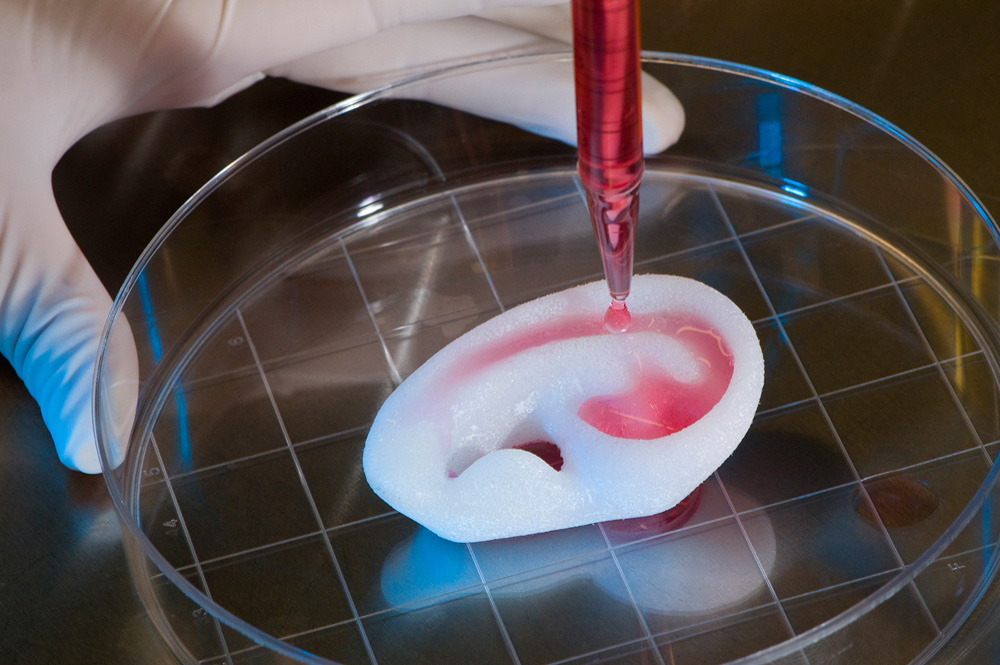
Regenerating a human ear using a scaffold

By 2016, regeneration had been operationalised and induced by four main techniques: regeneration by instrument; regeneration by materials; regeneration by 3D printing; and regeneration by drugs. By 2016, regeneration by instrument, regeneration by materials and by regeneration drugs had been generally operationalised in vivo (inside living tissues), while regeneration by 3D printing had been generally operationalised in vitro (inside the lab) in order to create and prepare tissue for transplantation.

=== By instrument ===
A cut by a knife or a scalpel generally scars, though a piercing by a needle does not. In 1976, a 3 by 3 cm scar on a non-diabetic was regenerated by insulin injections and the researchers, highlighting earlier research, argued that the insulin was regenerating the tissue. The anecdotal evidence also highlighted that a syringe was one of two variables that helped bring regeneration of the arm scar. The syringe was injected into the four quadrants three times a day for eighty-two days. After eighty-two days, after many consecutive injections, the scar was resolved and it was noted no scar was observable by the human eye. After seven months the area was checked again and it was once again noted that no scar could be seen.

In 1997, it was proven that wounds created with an instrument that are under 2mm can heal scar free, but larger wounds that are larger than 2mm healed with a scar.

In 2013, it was proven in pig tissue that full thickness micro columns of tissue, less than 0.5mm in diameter could be removed and that the replacement tissue, was regenerative tissue, not scar. The tissue was removed in a fractional pattern, with over 40% of a square area removed; and all of the fractional full thickness holes in the square area healed without scarring. In 2016 this fractional pattern technique was also proven in human tissue. In 2021, more people were paying attention to the possibility of scar free healing alongside new technologies involving instruments.

=== With materials ===
Generally, humans can regenerate injured tissues in vivo for limited distances of up to 2mm. The further the wound distance is from 2mm the more the wound regeneration will need inducement. By 2009, via the use of materials, a max induced regeneration could be achieved inside a 1 cm tissue rupture. Bridging the wound, the material allowed cells to cross the wound gap; the material then degraded. This technology was first used inside a broken urethra in 1996. In 2012, using materials, a full urethra was restored in vivo.

Macrophage polarization is a strategy for skin regeneration. Macrophages are differentiated from circulating monocytes. Macrophages display a range of phenotypes varying from the M1, pro-inflammatory type to the M2, pro-regenerative type. Material hydrogels polarise macrophages into the key M2 regenerative phenotype in vitro. In 2017, hydrogels provided full regeneration of skin, with hair follicles, after partial excision of scars in pigs and after full thickness wound incisions in pigs.

=== By 3D printing ===
In 2009, the regeneration of hollow organs and tissues with a long diffusion distance, was a little more challenging. Therefore, to regenerate hollow organs and tissues with a long diffusion distance, the tissue had to be regenerated inside the lab, via the use of a 3D printer.

Various tissues that have been regenerated by in vitro 3D printing include:

- The first organ ever induced and made in the lab was the bladder, which was created in 1999.
- By 2014, there had been various tissues regenerated by the 3D printer and these tissues included: muscle, vagina, penis and the thymus.
- In 2014, a conceptual human lung was first bioengineered in the lab. In 2015, the lab robustly tested its technique and regenerated a pig lung. The pig lung was then successfully transplanted into a pig without the use of immunosuppressive drugs.
- In 2015, researchers developed a proof of principle biolimb inside a laboratory; they also estimated that it would be at least a decade for any testing of limbs in humans. The limb demonstrated fully functioning skin, muscles, blood vessels and bones.
- In April 2019, researchers 3D printed a human heart. The prototype heart was made by human stem cells but only to the size of a rabbit's heart. In 2019, the researchers hoped to one day place a scaled up version of the heart inside humans.

==== Types of 3D printing used in manufacturing vascularized organs ====
- Extrusion

Extrusion based printing is a type of printing in which material is pushed through a nozzle and extruded onto a surface or medium. While material is being extruded, either the nozzle or the print bed is moved so that the material can be placed in complex shapes across it medium. Layers upon layers of material are placed until a 3D structure is formed. The extruded material comes out as a liquid and is solidified through varies means depending on the chemical or physical properties of the material. For example, the material could be solidified through the use of photoreceptive polymerization, in which light activates the material to solidify. The material could also be hardened through the use of chemicals or enzymes. Some examples of bioinks used in extrusion based printing include some alginates, hyaluronic acid, and gellan gum.

- Inkjet

Inkjet printing is similar to extrusion-based printing in that layers of materials are placed upon one another and can be hardened using various methods. Ink jet based printing differs however, in that the material is sprayed in droplets to selective locations to form layers, rather than placed as a stream of material. Inkjet printers can often contain multiple types of inks at once and can rapidly switch between them. Examples of bioinks used in inkjet based printing are fibrinogen and hydroxy-apatite.

- SLA

SLA printing is a method in which a laser is shined upon a photoreactive liquid material to harden or polymerize. Instead of material being pushed through a nozzle or jet, material sits in a large basin and is slowly hardened. Due to its use of light to harden the material, SLA printers can offer a very high resolution at a lower speed when compared to other methods. This method is often used for protein scaffolding and providing structural support for other printed biological materials. Examples of bioinks used in SLA printers include fibrin, collagen, and some alginates.

==== Gradations of complexity ====
Level 1	Level 2	Level 3	Level 4
Skin	Blood vessel	Bladder	Heart
Muscle	Trachea		Liver
Nails	Urethra		Pancreas
Corneal Endothelium			Penis

With printing tissues, by 2012, there were four accepted standard levels of regenerative complexity that were acknowledged in various academic institutions:

- Level one, flat tissue like skin was the simplest to recreate;
- Level two was tubular structures such as blood vessels;
- Level three was hollow non-tubular structures;
- Level four was solid organs, which were by far the most complex to recreate due to the vascularity.

In 2012, within 60 days it was possible, inside the lab, to grow tissue the size of half a postage stamp to the size of a football field. Most cell types could be grown and expanded outside of the body, with the exception of the liver, nerve and pancreas, as these tissue types need stem cell populations.

==== Manufactured vascularized organs ====
===== Heart =====
In 2024, researchers were able to 3D print a human heart with a biphasic bioink containing pluripotent stem cells (PSC). The technique they proposed and tested would first print the external features of the organ before then printing the internal features such as internal vasculature inside the previously printed structure. Both sets of printing were performed by extruding the bioink filament into layered structures set in a microgel medium. This technique was called the "SPIRIT" technique and allowed for the printing of a full-sized heart at significantly faster speeds than previous methods.

===== Liver =====
In 2022, researchers proposed a new method for printing vascularized human liver tissue. This new method consisted of using a 3D printer capable of holding seven different bioinks, with the ability to switch rapidly between these different bioinks to print different structures and shapes in the liver tissue. Due to the overall complexity of the organ, they were unable to print an entire liver but were still able to successfully print pieces of densely vascularized liver tissue.

===== Kidney =====
A new technique for 3D printing kidney tissue was developed in 2020 which resulted in the successful creation of a miniature, vascularized kidney. To do this, they used an extrusion method printer that could be fed two bioinks and would extrude the bioink as hollow tubes with one tube coating the other. In 2021, researchers expanded upon this technique by using PSCs differentiated into the correct cell type in the bioink. Using the PSC's allowed for increased vascularization, as the PSCs would differentiate into the correct cell types to build the structures of the blood vessels, rather than already differentiated cells having to be placed in the right locations.

===== Lung =====
In 2019, a method for printing alveoli was developed in which 2D slices of photosensitive hydrogel are successively cured to form a 3D structure of the alveoli. This produces a soft material that is able to easily expand and contract, while also maintaining biocompatibility. The level of curing for the hydrogel is controlled using additive food coloring which absorbs light and increases the curing at that location. This allows the curing to be directed to better form 3D shapes. This method was able to form functional and vascularized alveoli. In 2021, this technique was improved by using an inkjet printing method, which increased the accuracy and precision of alveolar structure. With this ink-jet method, researchers were able to create functional portions of alveolar tissue with increased stability and surfactant secretion.

===== Penis =====
In 2020, researchers developed a method for tissue repair of male genitals through the use of a bioink they designed. This bioink would include stem cells along with the ink itself to increase its compatibility with the body and its ability to heal. A hydrogel scaffold was printed using a 3D print-ultraviolet photo crosslinking strategy, which is similar in concept to an SLA printer. Their design was able to successfully be integrated the corpus cavernosum of a rabbit's penis. This printed structure was able to return functionality to the organ and increase its fertility. While not tested or created using human cells, further efforts are being conducted to improve this field.

=== With drugs ===
Lipoatrophy is the localised loss of fat in tissue. It is common in diabetics who use conventional insulin injection treatment. In 1949, a much more pure form of insulin was, instead of causing lipoatrophy, shown to regenerate the localised loss of fat after injections in to diabetics. In 1984, it was shown that different insulin injections have different regenerative responses with regards to creating skin fats in the same person. It was shown in the same body that conventional forms of insulin injections cause lipoatrophy and highly purified insulin injections cause lipohypertrophy. In 1976, the regenerative response was shown to work in a non-diabetic after a 3 × 3 cm lipoatrophic arm scar was treated with pure monocomponent porcine soluble insulin. A syringe injected insulin under the skin equally in the four quadrants of the defect. To layer four units of insulin evenly into the base of the defect, each quadrant of the defect received one unit of insulin three times a day, for eighty-two days. After eighty-two days of consecutive injections the defect regenerated to normal tissue.

In 2016, scientists could transform a skin cell into any other tissue type via the use of drugs. The technique was noted as safer than genetic reprogramming which, in 2016, was a concern medically. The technique, used a cocktail of chemicals and enabled efficient on site regeneration without any genetic programming. In 2016, it was hoped to one day use this drug to regenerate tissue at the site of tissue injury. In 2017, scientists could turn many cell types (such as brain and heart) into skin.

=== Research ===
Scientists found leprosy-causing bacteria viably regenerate and rejuvenate the liver in its armadillos hosts, which may enable novel human therapies based on knowledge or components gained from naturally evolved organisms or capabilities.

== Naturally regenerating appendages and organs ==
=== Heart ===
Cardiomyocyte necrosis activates an inflammatory response that serves to clear the injured myocardium from dead cells, and stimulates repair, but may also extend injury. Research suggests that the cell types involved in the process play an important role. Namely monocyte-derived macrophages tend to induce inflammation while inhibiting cardiac regeneration, while tissue resident macrophages may help restoration of tissue structure and function.

=== Endometrium ===
The endometrium after the process of breakdown via the menstruation cycle, re-epithelializes swiftly and regenerates. Though tissues with a non-interrupted morphology, like non-injured soft tissue, completely regenerate consistently; the endometrium is the only human tissue that completely regenerates consistently after a disruption and interruption of the morphology. The inner lining of the uterus is the only adult tissue to undergo rapid cyclic shedding and regeneration without scarring, shedding and restoring roughly inside a 7-day window on a monthly basis. All other adult tissues, upon rapid shedding or injury, can scar.

=== Fingers ===
In May 1932, L. H. McKim published a report describing the regeneration of an adult digit-tip following amputation. A house surgeon in the Montreal General Hospital underwent amputation of the distal phalanx to stop the spread of an infection. In less than one month following surgery, x-ray analysis showed the regrowth of bone while macroscopic observation showed the regrowth of nail and skin. This is one of the earliest recorded examples of adult human digit-tip regeneration.

Studies in the 1970s showed that children up to the age of 10 or so who lose fingertips in accidents can regrow the tip of the digit within a month provided their wounds are not sealed up with flaps of skin – the de facto treatment in such emergencies. They normally will not have a fingerprint, and if there is any piece of the finger nail left it will grow back as well, usually in a square shape rather than round.

In August 2005, Lee Spievack, then in his early sixties, accidentally sliced off the tip of his right middle finger just above the first phalanx. His brother, Dr. Alan Spievack, was researching regeneration and provided him with powdered extracellular matrix, developed by Dr. Stephen Badylak of the McGowan Institute of Regenerative Medicine. Mr. Spievack covered the wound with the powder, and the tip of his finger re-grew in four weeks. The news was released in 2007. Ben Goldacre has described this as "the missing finger that never was", claiming that fingertips regrow and quoted Simon Kay, professor of hand surgery at the University of Leeds, who from the picture provided by Goldacre described the case as seemingly "an ordinary fingertip injury with quite unremarkable healing"

A similar story was reported by CNN. A woman named Deepa Kulkarni lost the tip of her little finger and was initially told by doctors that nothing could be done. Her personal research and consultation with several specialists including Badylak eventually resulted in her undergoing regenerative therapy and regaining her fingertip.

=== Kidney ===
Regenerative capacity of the kidney has been recently explored.

The basic functional and structural unit of the kidney is nephron, which is mainly composed of four components: the glomerulus, tubules, the collecting duct and peritubular capillaries. The regenerative capacity of the mammalian kidney is limited compared to that of lower vertebrates.

In the mammalian kidney, the regeneration of the tubular component following an acute injury is well known. Recently regeneration of the glomerulus has also been documented. Following an acute injury, the proximal tubule is damaged more, and the injured epithelial cells slough off the basement membrane of the nephron. The surviving epithelial cells, however, undergo migration, dedifferentiation, proliferation, and redifferentiation to replenish the epithelial lining of the proximal tubule after injury. Recently, the presence and participation of kidney stem cells in the tubular regeneration has been shown. However, the concept of kidney stem cells is currently emerging. In addition to the surviving tubular epithelial cells and kidney stem cells, the bone marrow stem cells have also been shown to participate in regeneration of the proximal tubule, however, the mechanisms remain controversial. Studies examining the capacity of bone marrow stem cells to differentiate into renal cells are emerging.

Like other organs, the kidney is also known to regenerate completely in lower vertebrates such as fish. Some of the known fish that show remarkable capacity of kidney regeneration are goldfish, skates, rays, and sharks. In these fish, the entire nephron regenerates following injury or partial removal of the kidney.

=== Liver ===
The human liver is particularly known for its ability to regenerate, and is capable of doing so from only one quarter of its tissue, due chiefly to the unipotency of hepatocytes. Resection of liver can induce the proliferation of the remaining hepatocytes until the lost mass is restored, where the intensity of the liver's response is directly proportional to the mass resected. For almost 80 years surgical resection of the liver in rodents has been a very useful model to the study of cell proliferation.

=== Skin ===
Human skin has a limited capacity for regeneration, and wound healing therefore typically results in scar formation. In contrast, fetal skin is capable of healing without scarring, a phenomenon that has prompted research into the mechanisms underlying scarless healing and their potential application to regenerative therapies in adults.

=== Toes ===
Toes damaged by gangrene and burns in older people can also regrow with the nail and toe print returning after medical treatment for gangrene.

=== Vas deferens ===
The vas deferens can grow back together after a vasectomy–thus resulting in vasectomy failure. This occurs due to the fact that the epithelium of the vas deferens, similar to the epithelium of some other human body parts, is capable of regenerating and creating a new tube in the event that the vas deferens is damaged and/or severed. Even when as much as five centimeters, or two inches, of the vas deferens is removed, the vas deferens can still grow back together and become reattached–thus allowing sperm to once again pass and flow through the vas deferens, restoring one's fertility.

== Induced regeneration ==
There are several human tissues that have been successfully or partially induced to regenerate. Many fall under the topic of regenerative medicine, which includes the methods and research conducted with the aim of regenerating the organs and tissues of humans as a result of injury. The major strategies of regenerative medicine include dedifferentiating injury site cells, transplanting stem cells, implanting lab-grown tissues and organs, and implanting bioartificial tissues.

=== Bladder ===
In 1999, the bladder was the first regenerated organ to be given to seven patients; as of 2014, these regenerated bladders are still functioning inside the beneficiaries.

=== Fat ===
In 1949, purified insulin was shown to regenerate fat in diabetics with lipoatrophy. In 1976, after 82 days of consecutive injections into a scar, purified insulin was shown to safely regenerate fat and completely regenerate skin in a non-diabetic.

During a high-fat diet, and during hair follicle growth, mature adipocytes (fats) are naturally formed in multiple tissues. Fat tissue has been implicated in the inducement of tissue regeneration. Myofibroblasts are the fibroblast responsible for scar and in 2017 it was found that the regeneration of fat transformed myofibroblasts into adipocytes instead of scar tissue. Scientists also identified bone morphogenetic protein (BMP) signalling as important for myofibroblasts transforming into adipocytes for the purpose of skin and fat regeneration.

=== Heart ===
Cardiovascular diseases are the leading cause of death worldwide, and have increased proportionally from 25.8% of global deaths in 1990, to 31.5% of deaths in 2013. This is true in all areas of the world except Africa. In addition, during a typical myocardial infarction or heart attack, an estimated one billion cardiac cells are lost. The scarring that results is then responsible for greatly increasing the risk of life-threatening abnormal heart rhythms or arrhythmias. Therefore, the ability to naturally regenerate the heart would have an enormous impact on modern healthcare. However, while several animals can regenerate heart damage (e.g. the axolotl), mammalian cardiomyocytes (heart muscle cells) cannot proliferate (multiply) and heart damage causes scarring and fibrosis.

Despite the earlier belief that human cardiomyocytes are not generated later in life, a recent study has found that this is not the case. This study took advantage of the nuclear bomb testing and other radioactive sources during the Atomic Age which introduced carbon-14 into the atmosphere (essentially all of which had decayed up to that point in Earth's history) and therefore into the cells of biologically active inhabitants. They extracted DNA from the myocardium of these research subjects and found that cardiomyocytes do in fact renew at a slowing rate of 1% per year from the age of 25, to 0.45% per year at the age of 75 by comparing the presence of carbon-14 with the stable and abundant carbon-12. This amounts to less than half of the original cardiomyocytes being replaced during the average lifespan. However, serious doubts have been placed on the validity of this research, including the appropriateness of the samples as representative of normally aging hearts.

Further research has been conducted that supports the potential for human cardiac regeneration. Inhibition of p38 MAP kinase was found to induce mitosis in adult mammalian cardiomyocytes, while treatment with FGF1 and p38 MAP kinase inhibitors was found to regenerate the heart, reduce scarring, and improve cardiac function in rats with cardiac injury.

One of the most promising sources of heart regeneration is the use of stem cells. It was demonstrated in mice that there is a resident population of stem cells or cardiac progenitors in the adult heart – this population of stem cells was shown to be reprogrammed to differentiate into cardiomyocytes that replaced those lost during a heart tissue death. In humans specifically, a "cardiac mesenchymal feeder layer" was found in the myocardium that renewed the cells with progenitors that differentiated into mature cardiac cells. What these studies show is that the human heart contains stem cells that could potentially be induced into regenerating the heart when needed, rather than just being used to replace expended cells.

Loss of the myocardium due to disease often leads to heart failure; therefore, it would be useful to be able to take cells from elsewhere in the heart to replenish those lost. This was achieved in 2010 when mature cardiac fibroblasts were reprogrammed directly into cardiomyocyte-like cells. This was done using three transcription factors: GATA4, Mef2c, and Tbx5. Cardiac fibroblasts make up more than half of all heart cells and are usually not able to conduct contractions (are not cardiogenic), but those reprogrammed were able to contract spontaneously. The significance is that fibroblasts from the damaged heart or from elsewhere, may be a source of functional cardiomyocytes for regeneration.

Simply injecting functioning cardiac cells into a damaged heart is only partially effective. In order to achieve more reliable results, structures composed of the cells need to be produced and then transplanted. Masumoto and his team designed a method of producing sheets of cardiomyocytes and vascular cells from human iPSCs. These sheets were then transplanted onto infarcted hearts of rats, leading to significantly improved cardiac function. These sheets were still found to be present four weeks later. Research has also been conducted into the engineering of heart valves. Tissue-engineered heart valves derived from human cells have been created in vitro and transplanted into a non-human primate model. These showed a promising amount of cellular repopulation even after eight weeks, and succeeded in outperforming currently-used non-biological valves. In 2021, researchers demonstrated a switchable iPSCs-reprogramming-based approach for regeneration of damaged heart without tumor-formation in mice. In April 2019, researchers 3D printed a prototype human heart the size of a rabbit's heart.

=== Lung ===
Chronic obstructive pulmonary disease (COPD) is one of the most widespread health threats today. It affects 329 million people worldwide, which makes up nearly 5% of the global population. Having killed over 3 million people in 2012, COPD was the third greatest cause of death. Worse still, due to increasing smoking rates and the aging populations in many countries, the number of deaths as a result of COPD and other chronic lung diseases is predicted to continue increasing. Therefore, developments in the lung's capacity for regeneration is in high demand.

It has been shown that bone marrow-derived cells could be the source of progenitor cells of multiple cell lineages, and a 2004 study suggested that one of these cell types was involved in lung regeneration. Therefore, a potential source of cells for lung regeneration has been found; however, due to advances in inducing stem cells and directing their differentiation, major progress in lung regeneration has consistently featured the use of patient-derived iPSCs and bioscaffolds. The extracellular matrix is the key to generating entire organs in vitro. It was found that by carefully removing the cells of an entire lung, a "footprint" is left behind that can guide cellular adhesion and differentiation if a population of lung epithelial cells and chondrocytes are added. This has serious applications in regenerative medicine, particularly as a 2012 study successfully purified a population of lung progenitor cells that were derived from embryonic stem cells. These can then be used to re-cellularise a three-dimensional lung tissue scaffold.

A 2010 investigation used the ECM scaffold to produce entire lungs in vitro to be transplanted into living rats. These successfully enabled gas exchange but for short time intervals only. Nevertheless, this was a huge leap towards whole lung regeneration and transplants for humans, which has already taken another step forward with the lung regeneration of a non-human primate.

Cystic fibrosis is another disease of the lungs, which is highly fatal and genetically linked to a mutation in the CFTR gene. Through growing patient-specific lung epithelium in vitro, lung tissue expressing the cystic fibrosis phenotype has been achieved. This is so that modelling and drug testing of the disease pathology can be carried out with the hope of regenerative medical applications.

=== Penis ===
Penises have been successfully regenerated in the lab. Penises are harder to regenerate than the skin, bladder and vagina due to their structural complexity.

=== Spinal nerves ===
A goal of spinal cord injury research is to promote neuroregeneration, reconnection of damaged neural circuits. The nerves in the spine are a tissue that requires a stem cell population to regenerate. In 2012, a Polish fireman Darek Fidyka, with paraplegia of the spinal cord, underwent a procedure, which involved extracting olfactory ensheathing cells (OECs) from Fidyka's olfactory bulbs, and injecting these stem cells, in vivo, into the site of the previous injury. Fidyka eventually gained feeling, movement and sensation in his limbs, especially on the side where the stem cells were injected; he also reported gaining sexual function. Fidyka can now drive and can now walk some distance aided by a frame. He is believed to be the first person in the world to recover sensory function from a complete severing of the spinal nerves.

=== Thymus ===
The thymus gland is one of the first organs to degenerate in normal healthy individuals. Researchers from the University of Edinburgh have succeeded in regenerating a living organ that closely resembles a juvenile thymus in terms of structure and gene expression profile.

=== Vagina ===
Between the years 2005 and 2008, four women with vaginal hypoplasia due to Müllerian agenesis were given regenerated vaginas. Up to eight years after the transplants, all organs have normal function and structure.

== See also ==
- Cloning
- Decellularization
- Induced pluripotent stem cell
- Life extension
- Regenerative biology
- Rejuvenation (aging)
- Stem cell treatments
- Tissue engineering
