= Tabakov =

Tabakov, feminine: Tabakova is a Russian and Bulgarian surname. Notable people with the surname include:

- Anton Tabakov (born 1960), Russian actor
- Boyan Tabakov (born 1990), Bulgarian football player
- Dobrinka Tabakova (born 1980), British/Bulgarian composer
- Emil Tabakov (born 1947), Bulgarian conductor, composer and double-bass player
- Maya Tabakova (born 1978), Bulgarian rhythmic gymnast
- Oleg Tabakov (1935–2018), Russian actor
- Pavel Ivanov Tabakov, birth name of Pawel Tabakow (born 1975), Polish neurosurgeon
- Pavel Tabakov (footballer) (born 1970), Russian football player
- Pavel Tabakov (actor) (born 1995), Russian actor
- Pavlo Tabakov (born 1978), Ukrainian musician and singer
- Slavik Tabakov, British-Bulgarian medical physicist
- Stanoy Tabakov, Bulgarian sambo and MMA competitor
- Yuliya Tabakova (born 1980), Russian sprinter
