= Spinal cord injury research =

Spinal cord injury research seeks new ways to cure or treat spinal cord injury in order to lessen the debilitating effects of the injury in the short or long term. There is no cure for SCI, and current treatments are mostly focused on spinal cord injury rehabilitation and management of the secondary effects of the condition. Two major areas of research include neuroprotection, ways to prevent damage to cells caused by biological processes that take place in the body after the injury, and neuroregeneration, regrowing or replacing damaged neural circuits.

== Pathophysiology ==
Secondary injury takes place minutes to weeks after the initial insult and includes a number of cascading processes that further harm tissues already damaged by the primary injury. It results in formation of a glial scar, which impedes axonal growth.Secondary injuries can occur from different forms of stress added to the spinal cord in forms such as additional contusions, compressions, kinking, or stretching of the spinal cord.

Complications from a secondary SCI are a result of a homeostatic imbalance potentially leading to metabolic and hemostatic changes from an inflammatory response. Potential immediate effects of secondary SCI include neuronal injury, neuroinflammation, breakdown of blood-spinal cord barrier (BSCB), ischemic dysfunction, oxidative stress, and daily-life function complications.

== Animal models ==
Animals used as SCI model organisms in research include mice, rats, cats, dogs, pigs, and non-human primates; the latter are close to humans but raise ethical concerns about primate experimentation. Special devices exist to deliver blows of specific, monitored force to the spinal cord of an experimental animal. There are various mechanical impact classifications of these injuries that can be replicated in an animal model. This includes contusion, compression, collagenase and ischemia reperfusion, distraction, dislocation, and transection.

Limitations of these model experiments are common. For instance, ischemia-reperfusion SCI involves the interruption of blood flow to the spinal cord. Complications have been observed to arise in animal models from the need to cross clamp the aorta.

Epidural cooling saddles, surgically placed over acutely traumatized spinal cord tissue, have been used to evaluate potentially beneficial effects of localized hypothermia, with and without concomitant glucocorticoids.

== Surgery ==
Surgery is currently used to provide stability to the injured spinal column or to relieve pressure from the spinal cord. How soon after injury to perform decompressive surgery is a controversial topic, and it has been difficult to prove that earlier surgery provides better outcomes in human trials. Some argue that early surgery might further deprive an already injured spinal cord of oxygen, but most studies show no difference in outcomes between early (within three days) and late surgery (after five days), and some show a benefit to earlier surgery.

In 2014 Darek Fidyka underwent pioneering spinal surgery that used nerve grafts, from his ankle, to 'bridge the gap' in his severed spinal cord and olfactory ensheathing cells (OECs) to stimulate the spinal cord cells. The surgery was performed in Poland in collaboration with Prof. Geoff Raisman, chair of neural regeneration at University College London's Institute of Neurology, and his research team. The OECs were taken from the patient's olfactory bulbs in his brain and then grown in the lab, these cells were then injected above and below the impaired spinal tissue.

== Neuroprotection ==
Neuroprotection aims to prevent the harm that occurs from secondary injury. One example is to target the protein calpain which appears to be involved in apoptosis; inhibiting the protein has produced improved outcomes in animal trials. Iron from blood damages the spinal cord through oxidative stress, so one option is to use a chelation agent to bind the iron; animals treated this way have shown improved outcomes. Free radical damage by reactive oxygen species (ROS) is another therapeutic target that has shown improvement when targeted in animals. One antibiotic, minocycline, is under investigation in human trials for its ability to reduce free radical damage, excitotoxicity, disruption of mitochondrial function, and apoptosis. Riluzole, an anticonvulsant, is also being investigated in clinical trials for its ability to block sodium channels in neurons, which could prevent damage by excitotoxicity. Other potentially neuroprotective agents under investigation in clinical trials include cethrin, erythropoietin, and dalfampridine.

=== Hypothermia ===
One experimental treatment, therapeutic hypothermia, is used in treatment but there is no evidence that it improves outcomes. Some experimental treatments, including systemic hypothermia, have been performed in isolated cases in order to draw attention to the need for further preclinical and clinical studies to help clarify the role of hypothermia in acute spinal cord injury. Despite limited funding, a number of experimental treatments such as local spine cooling and oscillating field stimulation have reached controlled human trials.

=== Methylprednisolone ===
Inflammation and glial scar are considered important inhibitory factors to neuroregeneration after SCI. However, aside from methylprednisolone, none of these developments have reached even limited use in the clinical care of human spinal cord injury in the US. Methylprednisolone can be given shortly after the injury but evidence for harmful side effects outweighs that for a benefit. Research is being done into more efficient delivery mechanisms for methylprednisolone that would reduce its harmful effects.

== Neuroregeneration ==
Neuroregeneration aims to reconnect the broken circuits in the spinal cord to allow function to return. One way is to regrow axons, which occurs spontaneously in the peripheral nervous system. However, myelin in the central nervous system contains molecules that impede axonal growth; thus, these factors are a target for therapies to create an environment conducive to growth. One such molecule is Nogo-A, a protein associated with myelin. When this protein is targeted with inhibitory antibodies in animal models, axons grow better and functional recovery is improved.

== Stem cells ==
Stem cells are cells that can differentiate to become different types of cells. The hope is that stem cells transplanted into an injured area of the spinal cord will allow neuroregeneration. Types of cells being researched for use in SCI include embryonic stem cells, neural stem cells, mesenchymal stem cells, olfactory ensheathing cells, Schwann cells, activated macrophages, and induced pluripotent stem cells. When stem cells are injected in the area of damage in the spinal cord, they secrete neurotrophic factors, and these factors help neurons and blood vessels to grow, thus helping repair the damage. It is also necessary to recreate an environment in which stem cells will grow.

An ongoing Phase 2 trial in 2016 presented data showing that after 90 days of treatment with oligodendrocyte progenitor cells derived from embryonic stem cells, 4 out of 4 subjects with complete cervical injuries had improved motor levels, with 2 of 4 improving two motor levels (on at least one side, with one patient improving two motor levels on both sides). The trial's original endpoint had been 2/5 patients improving two levels on one side within 6–12 months. All 8 cervical subjects in this Phase 1–2 trial had exhibited improved upper extremity motor scores (UEMS) relative to baseline with no serious adverse side effects, and a 2010 Phase 1 trial in 5 thoracic patients has found no safety issues after 5–6 years of follow-up.

Six-month efficacy data is expected in January 2017; meanwhile, a higher dose is being investigated and the study is now also recruiting patients with incomplete injuries.

In 2022, a team reported the first engineered functional human (motor-)neuronal networks derived from induced pluripotent stem cells (iPSCs) from the patient for implantation to regenerate injured spinal cord that shows success in tests with mice.

=== Embryonic stem cells ===
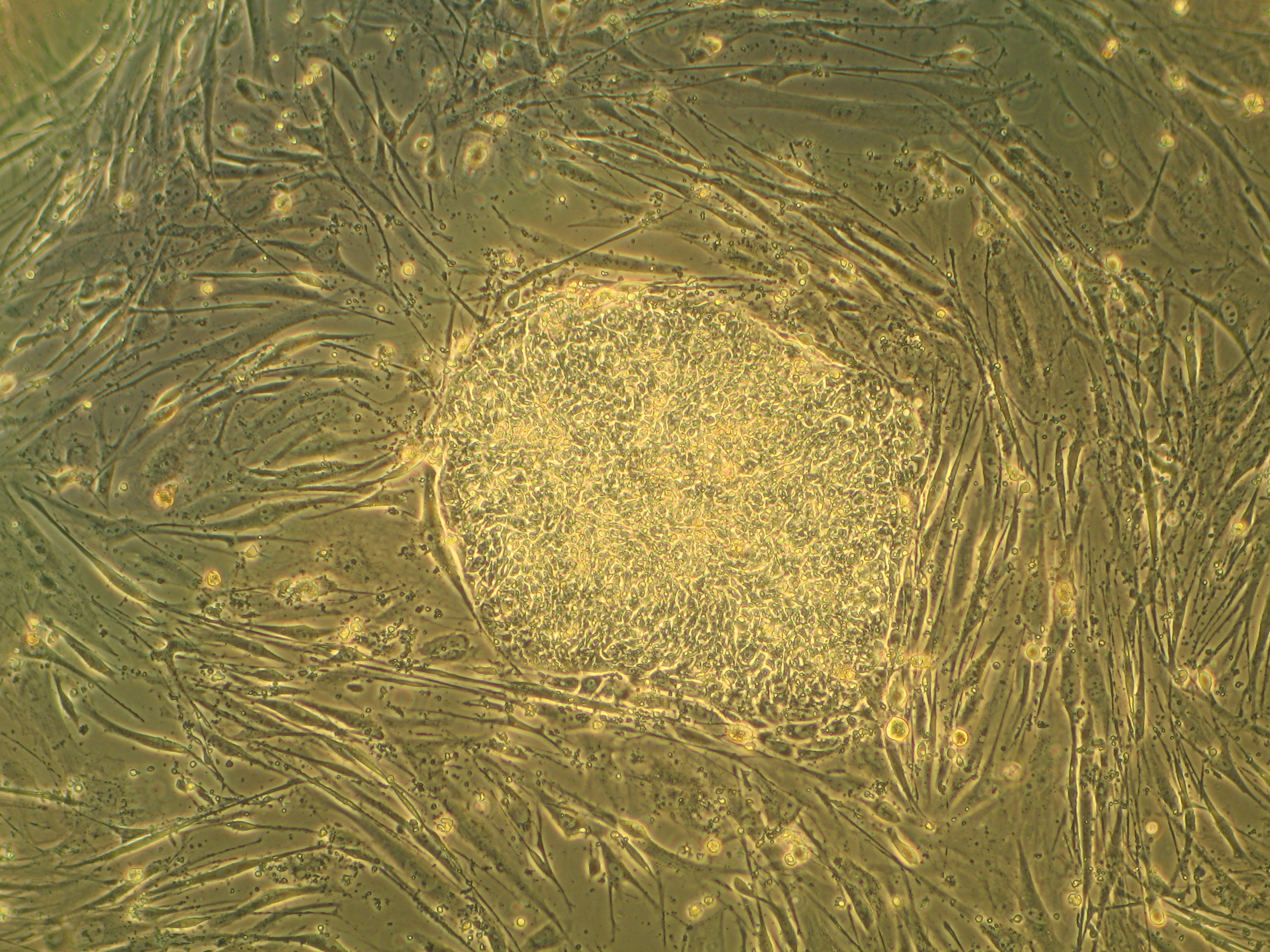
Human embryonic stem cells in cell culture

Embryonic stem cells (ESCs) are pluripotent; they can develop into every type of cell in an organism, such as oligodendrocytes. Oligodendrocytes and motor neurons have been predicted to be a favorable target for ESCs regarding treating neurological disorders and traumas. After a SCI takes place there is evidence of oligodendrocytes degradation, eventually leading to cell death. This results in a lack of myelination, which enhances signals sent amongst neurons, causing disfunction in signaling. A potential solution could be hESC-derived oligodendrocyte transplantation; however, the success of this process depends off the cell's ability to differentiate towards neural cell types in vitro. This is where more testing and research is being conducted using animal models.

=== Neural stem cells ===
Neural stem cells (NSCs) are multipotent; they can differentiate into different kinds of neural cells, either neurons or glia, namely oligodendrocytes and astrocytes. The hope is that these cells when injected into an injured spinal cord will replace killed neurons and oligodendrocytes and secrete factors that support growth. However they may fail to differentiate into neurons when transplanted, either remaining undifferentiated or becoming glia. A phase I/II clinical trials implanting NSCs into humans with SCI began in 2011 and ended in June 2015.

=== Mesenchymal stem cells ===
Mesenchymal stem cells do not need to come from fetuses, so avoid difficulties around ethics; they come from tissues including bone marrow, adipose tissue, the umbilical cord. Unlike other types of stem cells, mesenchymal cells do not present the threat of tumor formation or triggering an immune system response. Animal studies with injection of bone marrow stem cells have shown improvement in motor function; however not so in a human trial a year post-injury. More trials are underway. Adipose and umbilical tissue stem cells need further study before human trials can be performed, but two Korean studies were begun to investigate adipose cells in SCI patients.

=== Olfactory ensheathing cells ===
Transplantation of tissues such as olfactory ensheathing cells from the olfactory bulbs has been shown to produce beneficial effects in spinal cord injured rats. Trials have also begun to show success when olfactory ensheathing cells are transplanted into humans with severed spinal cords. People have recovered sensation, use of formerly paralysed muscles, and bladder and bowel function after the surgeries, eg Darek Fidyka.

=== Induced pluripotent stem cells ===
Japanese researchers in 2006 discovered that adding certain transcription factors to cells caused them to become pluripotent and able to differentiate into multiple cell types. This way a patient's own tissues could be used, theoretically because of a reduced chance of transplant rejection.

== Engineering approaches ==
Recent approaches have used various engineering techniques to improve spinal cord injury repair. Use of biomaterials is an engineering approach to SCI treatment that can be combined with stem cell transplantation. They can help deliver cells to the injured area and create an environment that fosters their growth. The general hypothesis behind engineered biomaterials is that bridging the lesion site using a growth permissive scaffold may help axons grow and thereby improve function. The biomaterials used must be strong enough to provide adequate support but soft enough not to compress the spinal cord. They must degrade over time to make way for the body to regrow tissue. Engineered treatments do not induce an immune response as biological treatments may, and they are easily tunable and reproducible. In-vivo administration of hydrogels or self-assembling nanofibers has been shown to promote axonal sprouting and partial functional recovery. In addition, administration of carbon nanotubes has shown to increase motor axon extension and decrease the lesion volume, without inducing neuropathic pain. In addition, administration of poly-lactic acid microfibers has shown that topographical guidance cues alone can promote axonal regeneration into the injury site. However, all of these approaches induced modest behavioral or functional recovery suggesting that further investigation is necessary.

=== Hydrogels ===
Hydrogels are structures made of polymers that are designed to be similar to the natural extracellular matrix around cells. They can be used to help deliver drugs more efficiently to the spinal cord and to support cells, and they can be injected into an injured area to fill a lesion. They can be implanted into a lesion site with drugs or growth factors in them to give the chemicals the best access to the damaged area and to allow sustained release.

=== Bionanoengineered scaffolds ===
In November 2021, a novel therapy for spinal cord injury was reported – an injectable gel of nanofibers that mimic the matrix around cells and contain molecules that were engineered to wiggle. These moving molecules connect with receptors of cells, causing repair signals inside – in particular, leading to relatively higher vascular growth, axonal regeneration, myelination, survival of motor neurons, reduced gliosis, and functional recovery – enabling paralyzed mice to walk again.

=== Exoskeletons ===
The technology for creating powered exoskeletons, wearable machinery to assist with walking movements, is currently making significant advances. There are products available, such as the Ekso, which allows individuals with up to a C7 complete (or any level of incomplete) spinal injury to stand upright and make technologically assisted steps. The initial purpose for this technology is for functional based rehabilitation, but as the technology develops, so will its uses.

Functional electrical stimulation (FES) uses coordinated electric shocks to muscles to cause them to contract in a walking pattern. While it can strengthen muscles, a significant downside for the users of FES is that their muscles tire after a short time and distance. One research direction combines FES with exoskeletons to minimize the downsides of both technologies, supporting the person's joints and using the muscles to reduce the power needed from the machine, and thus its weight. A research team at the McKelvey School of Engineering at Washington University in St. Louis, led by assistant professor of biomedical engineering Ismael Seáñez, is launching a clinical trial of electrical spinal cord stimulation for helping restore movement in movement-impaired or paralyzed patients.

=== Brain–computer interface ===
Recent research shows that combining brain–computer interface and functional electrical stimulation can restore voluntary control of paralyzed muscles. A study with monkeys showed that it is possible to directly use commands from the brain, bypassing the spinal cord and enable limited hand control and function.

=== Brain-machine interface ===
A 2016 study developed by the Walk Again Project with eight paraplegics demonstrated neurological recovery with the use of therapies based upon BMI, virtual reality and the use of robots. One patient became able to walk with supports after a decade paralysed and another became able to carry out a pregnancy.

=== Spinal cord implants ===
Spinal cord implants, such as e-dura implants, designed for implantation on the surface of the spinal cord, are being studied for paralysis following a spinal cord injury.

E-dura implants are designed using methods of soft neurotechnology, in which electrodes and a microfluidic delivery system are distributed along the spinal implant. Chemical stimulation of the spinal cord is administered through the microfluidic channel of the e-dura. The e-dura implants, unlike previous surface implants, closely mimic the physical properties of living tissue and can deliver electric impulses and pharmacological substances simultaneously. Artificial dura mater was constructed through the utilization of PDMS and gelatin hydrogel. The hydrogel simulates spinal tissue and a silicone membrane simulates the dura mater. These properties allow the e-dura implants to sustain long-term application to the spinal cord and brain without leading to inflammation, scar tissue buildup, and rejection normally caused by surface implants rubbing against nerve tissue.

In 2018 two distinct research teams from Minnesota's Mayo Clinic and Kentucky's University of Louisville managed to restore some mobility to patients suffering from paraplegia with an electronic spinal cord stimulator. The theory behind the new spinal cord stimulator is that in certain cases of spinal cord injury the spinal nerves between the brain and the legs are still alive, but just dormant. On 1 November 2018 a third distinct research team from the University of Lausanne published similar results with a similar stimulation technique in the journal Nature. In 2022, researchers demonstrated a spinal cord stimulator that enabled patients with spinal cord injury to walk again via epidural electrical stimulation (EES) with substantial neurorehabilitation-progress during the first day. In a study published in May 2023 in the journal Nature, researchers in Switzerland described implants which allowed a 40-year old man, paralyzed from the hips down for 12 years, to stand, walk and ascend a steep ramp with only the assistance of a walker. More than a year after the implant was inserted, he has retained these abilities and was walking with crutches even when the implant was switched off.

== Bibliography ==
- Bigelow, S.; Medzon, R. (16 June 2011). "Injuries of the spine: Nerve". In Legome, E.; Shockley, L.W. (eds.). Trauma: A Comprehensive Emergency Medicine Approach. Cambridge University Press. ISBN 978-1-139-50072-2.
