= Rehabilitation robotics =

Area of medical research

Rehabilitation robotics is a field of research dedicated to understanding and augmenting rehabilitation through the application of robotic devices. Rehabilitation robotics includes development of robotic devices tailored for assisting different sensorimotor functions(e.g. arm, hand, leg, ankle), development of different schemes of assisting therapeutic training, and assessment of sensorimotor performance (ability to move) of patient; here, robots are used mainly as therapy aids instead of assistive devices. Rehabilitation using robotics is generally well tolerated by patients, and has been found to be an effective adjunct to therapy in individuals with motor impairments, especially due to stroke.

== Overview ==
Rehabilitation robotics can be considered a specific focus of biomedical engineering, and a part of human-robot interaction. In this field, clinicians, therapists, and engineers collaborate to help rehabilitate patients.

Prominent goals in the field include: developing implementable technologies that can be easily used by patients, therapists, and clinicians; enhancing the efficacy of clinician's therapies; and increasing the ease of activities in the daily lives of patients.

== History ==
=== Early Developments (1960s–1980s) ===
The origins of rehabilitation robotics can be traced to early research in exoskeletons and powered orthoses. In the 1960s, the first powered exoskeletons, such as the Hardiman project by General Electric, were developed, though they were primarily intended for military applications. By the 1980s, research shifted toward medical applications, with early robotic aids designed to assist stroke patients and individuals with spinal cord injuries.

=== Growth and Clinical Applications (1990s–2000s) ===
The 1990s saw the introduction of dedicated robotic rehabilitation devices. One of the most notable early systems was the MIT-Manus, developed at the Massachusetts Institute of Technology, which provided robotic-assisted therapy for stroke patients. Around the same time, Lokomat, a robotic gait training system developed by Hocoma, revolutionized lower-limb rehabilitation by enabling repetitive, intensive walking therapy.

During the 2000s, the field expanded significantly, integrating robotics with neuroplasticity research to enhance patient recovery. The use of robotic therapy was supported by studies showing improved outcomes for patients undergoing post-stroke rehabilitation. Key advancements included the introduction of brain-computer interfaces (BCIs) to improve control mechanisms and adaptive algorithms to tailor therapy to individual needs.

=== Modern Advances (2010s–Present) ===
In the 2010s, rehabilitation robotics evolved with the advent of soft robotics, wearable exoskeletons, and AI-driven rehabilitation strategies. Companies and research institutions developed lightweight, portable devices, such as the ReWalk and Ekso Bionics exoskeletons, to assist individuals with mobility impairments in regaining movement.

Recent trends include the integration of virtual reality (VR) and machine learning to personalize rehabilitation programs further. Tele-rehabilitation, allowing remote monitoring and therapy using robotic systems, has gained traction, particularly following the COVID-19 pandemic, which accelerated the need for remote healthcare solutions.

== Function ==
Designers develop rehabilitation robots with applications of techniques that determine the adaptability level of the patient. Techniques include but are not limited to: active assisted exercise, active constrained exercise, active resistive exercise, passive exercise, and adaptive exercise. In active assisted exercise, the patient moves his or her hand in a predetermined pathway without any force pushing against it. Active constrained exercise is the movement of the patient's arm with an opposing force; if it tries to move outside of what it is supposed to. Active resistive exercise involves movement with opposing forces.

Over the years the number of rehabilitation robotics has grown but they are very limited due to the clinical trials. Many clinics have trials but do not accept the robots because they wish they were remotely controlled. Having robots involved in the rehabilitation of a patient has a few positive aspects. One of the positive aspects involves the potential repetition of the process or exercise as many times as required. Another positive aspect is the availability of exact measurements of patient improvement or decline. Exact measurements can come from the sensors on the device. While the device is taking a measurement you need to be careful because the device can be disrupted once it is done because of the different movements the patient does to get out. The rehabilitation robot can apply constant therapy for long periods. In the process of a recovery the rehabilitation robot is unable to understand the patient's needs like a well-experienced therapist would. The robot is unable to understand now, but in the future the device will be able to understand. Another plus of having a rehabilitation robot is that there is no physical effort put into work by the therapist.

Lately, rehabilitation robotics have been used in training in medicine, surgery, remote surgery and other areas, but there have been too many complaints about the robot not being controlled by a remote. Many people might think that an industrial robot could function like a rehabilitation robot, but this is not true. Rehabilitation robots need to be adjustable and programmable, because the robot may be used for multiple purposes. On the other hand, an industrial robot is always the same; there is no need to change the robot unless the product it is working with is bigger or smaller. In order for an industrial robot to work it would have to be more adjustable to its new task.

== Types of robots ==
There are primarily two types of robots that can be used for rehabilitation: End-effector based robots and powered exoskeletons. Each system has their own advantages and limitations. End-effector systems are faster to set up and are more adaptable. On the other hand, exoskeletons offer more precise joint isolation and improve gait transparency.

== Current areas of research ==
Current robotic devices include exoskeletons for aiding limb or hand movement, enhanced treadmills, robotic arms to retrain motor movement of the limb, and finger rehabilitation devices. Some devices are meant to aid strength development of specific motor movements, while others seek to aid these movements directly. Often robotic technologies attempt to leverage the principles of neuroplasticity by improving quality of movement, and increasing the intensity and repetition of the task. Over the last two decades, research into robot mediated therapy for the rehabilitation of stroke patients has grown significantly as the potential for cheaper and more effective therapy has been identified. Though stroke has been the focus of most studies due to its prevalence in North America, rehabilitation robotics can also be applied to individuals (including children) with cerebral palsy, or those recovering from orthopedic surgery.

An additional benefit to this type of adaptive robotic therapy is a marked decrease in spasticity and muscle tone in the affected arm. Different spatial orientations of the robot allow for horizontal or vertical motion, or a combination in a variety of planes. The vertical, anti-gravity setting is particularly useful for improving shoulder and elbow function.

== See also ==
- Hybrid Assistive Limb
- Rehabilitation engineering
- Robotics
- Prosthetics
