= Pawel Tabakow =

Polish neurosurgeon (born 1975)

Paweł Tabakow
- Born: October 8, 1975 (age 50); Sofia, Bulgaria
- Education: Wrocław Medical University
- Known for: Pioneering spinal surgery
- Scientific career
- Fields: surgery

Paweł Tabakow (born Pavel Ivanov Tabakov, Bulgarian: Павел Иванов Табаков; born October 8, 1975) is a Polish neurosurgeon who is known for prepared and performing the operation that allowed Darek Fidyka to recover sensory and motor function after the complete severing of his spinal cord. Tabakow has claimed that an Indian ambassador and other people from round the world have contacted him about performing similar treatments.

== Biography ==
Paweł Tabakow was born in Sofia, Bulgaria in 1975 and is a son of Bulgarian mathematician Ivan Tabakov. He graduated from the German High School in Sofia in 1994 and enrolled to study medicine in Wrocław, Poland.

He works in Department of Neurosurgery at Wrocław Medical University, and works at Wrocław University Hospital.

== See also ==
- Geoffrey Raisman, one of the leading researchers involved in Fidyka's treatment
- Spinal cord injury
- Olfactory ensheathing glia
