= Geoffrey Raisman =

British neuroscientist (1939-2017)

Professor Geoffrey (Geoff) Raisman FRS (28 June 1939 – 27 January 2017) was a British neuroscientist.

== Personal life ==
He was born in Leeds and died in London. His parents were Harry and Celia Raisman, both also born in Leeds. Geoffrey's grandparents were Jewish immigrants from Lithuania. He describes his family's story in his book, The Undark Sky. Raisman was not religious. He attended Roundhay School and Pembroke College, Oxford.

== Career ==
He was chair of neural regeneration at University College London's Institute of Neurology. In 2014, his team claimed to have regrown nerve cells where they had been severed, restoring the damaged spinal cord of the Polish paraplegic Darek Fidyka.
