= Pavel Tabakov (footballer) =

Russian footballer and coach

Personal information
- Full name: Pavel Vladimirovich Tabakov
- Date of birth: 12 January 1970 (age 56)
- Height: 1.86 m (6 ft 1 in)
- Position: Defender

Team information
- Current team: FC Akademiya-Lada-M (assistant coach)

Senior career*
Years	Team	Apps	(Gls)
1987–1988	FC Torpedo Togliatti	25	(2)
1989	ShVSM-SKA Kuybyshev	28	(2)
1990	MTsOP-Metallurg Verkhnyaya Pyshma	19	(4)
1991–2001	FC Lada Togliatti	346	(12)
1992	→ Lada-2 (loan)		
1995	→ Lada-2 (loan)	3	(0)
2002–2003	FC KAMAZ Naberezhnye Chelny	54	(7)
2004–2008	FC Lada Togliatti	130	(4)

Managerial career
- 2009: FC Lada-2
- 2010–2015: Konoplyov football academy
- 2015–: FC Akademiya-Lada-M (assistant)
- * Club domestic league appearances and goals

Pavel Vladimirovich Tabakov (Russian: Павел Владимирович Табаков; born 12 January 1970) is a Russian football coach and a former player.
