= Darek Fidyka =

Polish former firefighter (born 1974)

- Born: Dariusz Fidyka c. 1974
- Occupation: Volunteer firefighter
- Known for: First person to fully recover from paraplegia

Dariusz "Darek" Fidyka (born c. 1974) is a Polish firefighter and recovering paraplegic who became the first person in history to verifiably recover sensory and motor function after the complete severing of his spinal cord.

Having been paralysed from the chest down in a knife attack in 2010, Fidyka regained the ability to walk in 2014 after receiving a pioneering regenerative treatment from a British-advised Polish surgical team.

== Biography ==
=== Pioneering spinal surgery ===
In 2012, Fidyka began receiving treatment from a collaborative team of Polish surgeons and researchers, in collaboration with British scientists based at UCL's Institute of Neurology, who used a pioneering technique, based on research by Geoffrey Raisman, to repair the damage to his spinal nerves. Prior to this, Fidyka had had no feeling in his lower body and remained unable to walk, despite undergoing an intensive rehabilitory physiotherapy program.

The treatment consisted of intensive pre-operative and post-operative rehabilitation and a clinical procedure, conducted by surgeons and researchers at Wrocław Medical University in collaboration with University College London's Institute of Neurology. The surgical part of the project was funded by The Nicholls Spinal Injury Foundation who also supported the UK research, along with UK Stem Cell Foundation. The Polish surgical team, led by the neurosurgeon Pawel Tabakow, extracted olfactory ensheathing cells (OECs) from Fidyka's olfactory bulbs and grew a cell culture sufficient to repair his damaged spinal nerves, exploiting the OECs' ability to renew damaged nerve fibres. Nerve fibres from Fidyka's ankle were surgically implanted in his damaged spinal cord to provide a framework for the OECs, which were then implanted above and below the damaged area in a series of 100 separate micro-injections. The OECs gradually regenerated Fidyka's severed nerve fibres, restoring his sensory and motor functions. Darek Fidyka lives for the most part of year and has been rehabilitating in the "Akson" Neuro-Rehabilitation Center for the Treatment of Spinal Cord Injuries in Wroclaw, that is affiliated with Wroclaw Medical University. In March 2016, the medical centre that helped Fidyka regain neural function of his limbs announced they are looking for two people to help confirm the treatment in a trial that will be independently assessed.

=== Recovery ===
Fidyka began to regain strength in his thigh muscles three months after receiving the treatment, and was able to walk in a very limited fashion within six months. In October 2014, after two years of further rehabilitation, he was able to walk outside of the hospital with the assistance of a frame, could drive a car, and had also regained some bladder and bowel control and sexual function.

Fidyka subsequently featured in the BBC Panorama episode "To Walk Again", which led to him receiving thousands of messages from other paraplegics seeking the same treatment.

In February 2015, Fidyka visited the UK to participate in Arsenal F.C.'s guard of honour and raise money for the Nicholls Spinal Injury Foundation.

As of 2016, Fidyka could cycle a tricycle.

== See also ==
- Geoffrey Raisman, one of the leading researchers involved in Fidyka's treatment
