= Gait training =

Learning how to walk

Gait training is the act of re- learning or learning how to walk, at any point of time, after sustaining an injury or disability through rehabilitation and/ or the need of an assistive device. Normal human gait is a complex process, which happens due to co-ordinated movements of the whole of the body, requiring the whole of Central Nervous System - the brain and spinal cord, to function properly. Any disease process affecting the brain, spinal cord, peripheral nerves emerging from them supplying the muscles, or the muscles itself can cause deviations of gait. The process of relearning how to walk is generally facilitated by Physiatrists or Rehabilitation medicine (PM&R) consultants, physical therapists or physiotherapists, along with occupational therapists and other allied specialists. The most common cause for gait impairment is due to an injury of one or both legs. Gait training is not simply re-educating a patient on how to walk, but also includes an initial assessment of their gait cycle - Gait analysis, creation of a plan to address the problem, as well as teaching the patient on how to walk on different surfaces. Assistive devices and splints (orthosis) are often used in gait training, especially with those who have had surgery or an injury on their legs, but also with those who have balance or strength impairments as well.

Gait training can be useful for people with the following conditions:

- Amputation and after prosthetic fitment
- Osteoarthritis
- Muscular dystrophy
- Cerebral palsy
- Stroke
- Polio
- Spinal cord injury
- Parkinson's disease
- Multiple sclerosis
- Brain and spinal cord injuries
- After surgery
- Sports injury

Although gait training with parallel bars, treadmills and support systems can be beneficial, the long-term aim of gait training is usually to reduce patients' dependence on such technology in order to walk more in their daily lives.

== Gait cycle ==
A gait cycle is defined as the progression of movements that occurs before one leg can return to a certain position during walking, or ambulation. One example of a full gait cycle is the period it takes for a foot to leave the ground until the same leaves the ground again. An understanding of a normal gait cycle and how it progresses is crucial to determining how much assistance a patient needs in order to return to functional ambulation. How long the gait cycle lasts depends on multiple factors, such as age, walking surface, and walking speed.

Stance and swing phases of the right lower extremity gait cycle.

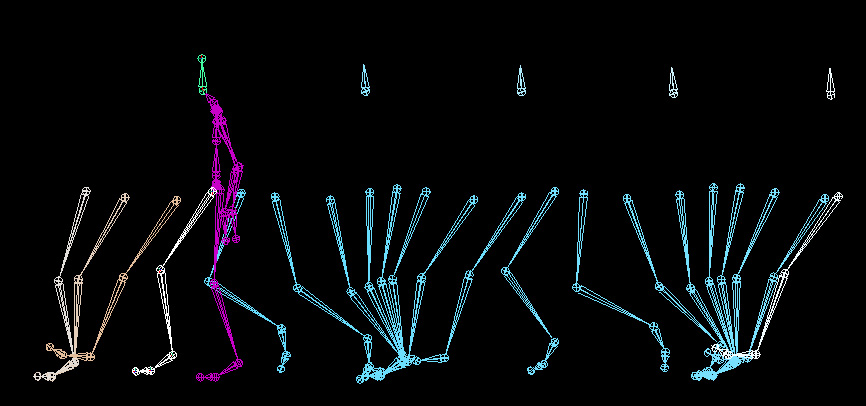
Simulation of the gait cycle.

The gait cycle is studied in two phases - Swing and stance phase. Each of these is further divided based on the positioning of the foot during these phases.

Any gait training addressing a gait abnormality starts with a proper gait analysis. Observational, video, electromyographic and force plate techniques are few of them for assessing different parameters of gait. The cheapest way consists of observational combined with a video gait analysis, but more quantitative analysis can be done with integrating force vectors from a force plate and joint angle motion data incorporated through myoelectric sensors. Basically, kinetic and kinematic analysis are done for gait, the former consisting of the forces resulting in and from walking and latter consists of describing the visible components such as joint angles and distances covered. The gait consists of a series of repetitive movements of the whole body during locomotion and is studied considering that each gait cycle repeats over itself, which is almost correct considering normal subjects. The basic two phases are swing and stance phases, depending on whether the leg is free to swing or is in contact with the ground during the phase of gait studied.

=== Stance ===
The stance phase begins when the foot first makes contact with the ground (initial contact), and the weight of the body is borne by that limb. This phase is approximately 60% of the gait cycle and takes about 0.6 seconds to complete at a normal walking speed. Included in the stance phase are another four intervals, which are: load response, midstance, terminal stance, and preswing. Load response occurs when the body weight is borne by the single foot while the other foot begins to lift off the ground to start its swing phase. At midstance the body is supported fully by one leg and the other is no longer in contact with the ground. During terminal stance body weight is still supported on one leg, however the heel of that leg is beginning to lift off, and the center of gravity is in front of the foot still in contact with the ground. Finally at preswing the toe of the stance foot comes off the ground, and the weight is now transferred to the leg that was previously in the swing phase.

=== Swing ===
The swing phase occurs when the foot is not in contact with the ground, and constitutes about 40% of the gait cycle. There are three intervals to this phase: initial swing, midswing, and terminal swing. During initial swing, the foot is lifted off the floor. Next it moves into midswing, when the lower leg is straight and is perpendicular to the floor. Finally, at the terminal phase, the foot comes back into contact with the floor again and restarts the cycle beginning in initial contact of the stance phase.

== Assistive devices ==
Assistive devices (ADs) are given to patients who have difficulty maintaining a regular gait cycle or balance due to an injury to one or both of their legs. Other factors that would necessitate use of an AD include loss of perception in the legs, weakness of the legs, pain while walking, and a history of falling, among other indications. Not only does an AD provide extra support, it can also protect the injured leg and prevent it from being further aggravated due to weight bearing requirements. Different ADs are assigned to each patient depending on the severity of their condition and how much extra support they need provided. The following list presents the ADs from the least supportive to the most supportive.

- Straight cane
- Lofstrand crutches
- Axillary crutches
- Walkers
- Parallel bars
- Gait trainers
- Overhead track harness systems

== Weight bearing status ==
The type of gait that a patient is instructed in is based on their weight-bearing status, or how much of their body weight can be supported on their legs, coordination, and strength. There are different levels of weight-bearing status that is determined by the physician. The weight-bearing status of a patient generally changes as treatment progresses, but each progression needs to be approved by the physician. In many cases the easiest way to monitor a patient's weight bearing status is to use two scales, one under each foot, and to adjust the weight on each foot until the injured foot is supported the desired amount of weight.

There are four different weight-bearing statuses.

- Non-weight bearing (NWB)
- Touch-down weight bearing (TDWB) or toe touch weight bearing (TTWB)
- Partial weight bearing (PWB)
- Weight bearing as tolerated (WBAT)

In NWB, the patient is not allowed to bear any weight on their injured leg. For TTWB, the amount of weight placed on the leg is defined in many ways, such as being approximately 20% of body weight, being 10 to 15 kg of weight, or being equal to or less than a weight that would crush eggshells. The portion of weight that is allowed to be borne on the injured leg in PWB is generally given as a percentage, such as 25% or 50%, however with a percentage the amount of weight that is supported changes as the person's weight changes as well. In WBAT the person is allowed to bear as much weight as pain allows, provided that the pain level does not become difficult to tolerate.

== Gait training using assistive devices ==
There are multiple possible gait patterns that can be taught to the patient, and the one that is taught depends on the patient's capability and coordination. Parallel bars may be used to help with gait training, especially in the early stages when a patient is first learning or re-learning to walk. They involve a person walking between two handrails to support themselves, often with the therapist either helping to support the patient or physically moving the patient's legs. A gait belt is also utilized by the physical therapist in order to support the patient and to prevent them from falling or placing too much weight on the injured leg.

=== Two-point gait pattern ===
The two-point gait pattern closely imitates a unaffected gait pattern, but includes the use of two crutches or two canes with one on either side of the body. In this pattern one crutch and the leg opposite to the crutch is moved in unison. For example if the right crutch is moved forward, then the left leg would advance with it. This gait pattern requires a high level of coordination and balance.

Another two-point gait pattern is the modified two-point pattern. In this pattern there is only use of one crutch or cane on the side opposite to the injured leg, therefore there can not be any weight bearing restriction but is more used to provide extra balance. For this pattern the AD is move simultaneously with the injured leg.

=== Three-point gait pattern ===
A three-point gait pattern can be used with patients who are NWB, however requires a much higher energy output and requires the patient to have good balance as well as strong upper limbs. A walker or two crutches must be used, as this pattern can not be performed with the use of a single cane. For this pattern the AD is advanced first, then the uninjured leg is moved up as the body is supported on the AD. The uninjured leg can either be brought up to be level with the AD (swing to) or brought up to be ahead of the AD (swing through).

There is also a modified three-point gait pattern which can be used with patients who are PWB on their injured leg but full weight bearing (FWB) on their uninjured leg. This pattern also requires the use of 2 crutches or a walker, but is slower and more stable than the three-point gait pattern. In the modified pattern, the AD is advanced first, followed by the injured leg that has a PWB status, then finally the uninjured leg is moved up. Similarly, a four-point gait pattern has also been described. Just as in the three-point gait pattern the patient may use a swing to or a swing through pattern.

=== Stairs ===
==== Ascending stairs ====
Two crutches or a cane can be used to ascending a flight of stairs. Although a walker may also be used, it is not recommended to be used to climb stairs longer than 2 or 3 steps. If the patient is using two crutches, then both crutches are held in one hand while the other hand grips the handrail. If there is no handrail or if it the two crutches can not be held in one hand, both crutches may be used without use of the handrail, although this method is not recommended for taking more than 2 or 3 steps. The order of events goes: uninjured foot, crutches or cane, injured foot. This process is repeated until the patient reaches the top of the stairs.

==== Descending stairs ====
Just as in ascending stairs, two crutches or a cane may be used to descend a flight of stairs, and use of a walker is not recommended for climbing more than 2 or 3 steps. Both crutches should be used if the handrail is unstable or if the two crutches are not able to be held securely in one hand. The crutches or cane descends to the first step, then is followed by the injured leg, then finally the uninjured leg. This process is repeated until the bottom of the stairs is reached.

Simply put, when ascending stairs, the user want to go up with the good legs and descend with the bad leg.

== Other applications ==
Body-weight support (BWS) systems or unweighting devices are starting to become more and more popular and have been the subject of much study. BWS systems can be used prior to the patient gaining adequate motor control or having sufficient strength to fully bear weight. The patient will wear a specialized trunk harness with adjustable straps, which attach to an overhead suspension system. The harness and its attachments support a certain amount of the patient's body weight. Gait training techniques that utilize a BWS system appear to be promising in their ability to improve and possibly restore walking function, as demonstrated in individuals suffering from incomplete spinal cord injuries. A BWS system can be used on a treadmill or over ground for gait training. Body-weight-supported treadmill training (BWSTT) enables individuals with motor deficits that have rendered them incapable of completely supporting their own body weight to practice and experience locomotion at physiological speeds. Depending on the severity of the person's impairment, one or more physiotherapists may be present to assist in maintaining the patient's appropriate posture and moving their legs through as kinematically physiological a gait pattern as possible. Recently, electromechanical devices such as the Hocoma Lokomat robot-driven gait orthosis have been introduced with the intention of reducing the physical labour demands on therapists. This system uses a computer-controlled exoskeleton to repeatedly and consistently guide lower-limb movements, making BWSTT a more feasible option for long-term and widespread use.

Another device category, so-called end-effector gait trainers, activates the human gait pattern over moving foot-plates as opposed to an orthosis. The German society for Neurorehabilitation has recently recommended end-effector devices for gait rehabilitation after stroke due to current medical evidence.

Treadmill training, with or without a body-weight support, is an emerging therapy and is being used with stroke patients to improve kinematic gait parameters. These patients often present with significant gait deviations and body weight-supported treadmill training can provide an intense repetitive practice of a more natural gait pattern. Literature continues to emerge examining the influence treadmill speed may have on the improvement of gait patterns and functional independence. Research has shown that a greater gain in independent walking ability is seen in hemiparetic stroke patients who participate in structured speed-dependent treadmill training compared to conventional training. Improvements in gait parameters included walking speed, cadence, stride length and Functional Ambulation Category scores. Research shows that balance and leg training can improve walking speed and step length, with gains of about 0.26 m/s, an important factor linked to longevity. In speed-dependent treadmill training, belt speed is increased to the maximum-achievable speed the patient can maintain for 10 seconds without stumbling, followed by a period of recovery. If the patient were capable of maintaining the speed safely and comfortably during the 10-second bout, it would then be increased by 10% in the next attempt, following the same work and recovery procedures. Research has shown that this form of gait training demonstrates a more normal walking pattern without the compensatory movements commonly associated with stroke.

Electromechanical-assisted gait training is another strategy that helps with gait training in people who have suffered a stroke. Evidence demonstrates that this method should only be applied to people who are unable to walk and it should be used in the first 3 months after the stroke, in order to maximize results.
