= Olfactory ensheathing cell =

Type of macroglia that ensheath unmyelinated olfactory neurons

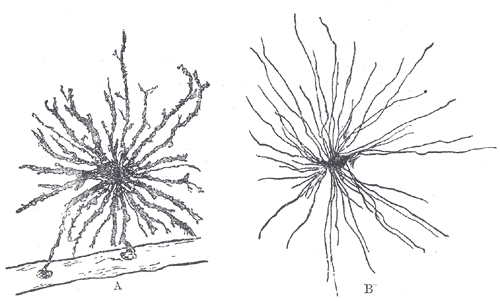
Neuroglia of the brain shown by Golgi's method

Olfactory ensheathing cells (OECs), also known as olfactory ensheathing glia or olfactory ensheathing glial cells, are a type of macroglia (radial glia) found in the nervous system. They are also known as olfactory Schwann cells, because they ensheath the non-myelinated axons of olfactory neurons in a similar way to which Schwann cells ensheath non-myelinated peripheral neurons. They also share the property of assisting axonal regeneration.

OECs are capable of phagocytosing axonal debris in vivo, and in vitro they phagocytose bacteria. Olfactory glia that express the antimicrobial enzyme lysozyme (LYZ) are thought to play an important role in immunoprotection in the mucosa, where neurons are directly exposed to the external environment.

OECs have been tested successfully in experimental axonal regeneration in adult rats with traumatic spinal cord damage, and clinical trials are currently being conducted to obtain more information on spinal cord injuries and other neurodegenerative diseases.

== Origin ==
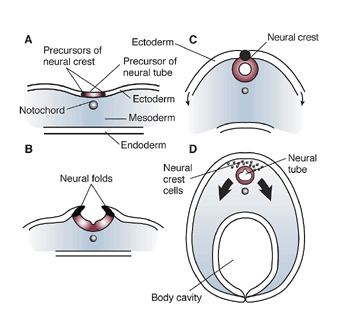
Embryonic development in the central nervous system

In the peripheral nervous system OECs are dispersed within the olfactory epithelium and the olfactory nerve. In the central nervous system, OECs are found within the outer two layers of the olfactory bulb. During development, primitive olfactory neurons extend their axons from the olfactory placode, through the mesenchyme, towards the telencephalic vesicle. After reaching the telencephalic vesicle, a small layer of cells and axons cover the vesicle. Olfactory axons invade the basal lamina of the glia limitans and the olfactory bulb to create the olfactory nerve and glomerular layers. A fraction of the epithelial migrating precursors give rise to olfactory ensheathing glia that inhabit the olfactory nerve and glomerular layers. OECs and astrocytes interact with each other to form a new glia limitans. OECs are distinct from other glia in their developmental origin for they are present in the peripheral nervous system as well as the central nervous system. They also form on bundles of olfactory sensory neuron axons in a manner distinct from myelination.

== Functions ==
OECs are radial glia that perform a variety of functions. Within the olfactory system they phagocytose axonal debris and dead cells. When cultured in a petri dish (in vitro), they phagocytose bacteria. Multiple studies have shown that OECs may assist in treating spinal cord injury (SCI) due to their regenerative properties in the peripheral nervous system and their presence in the central nervous system. OECs are also known to support and guide olfactory axons, grow through glial scars, and secrete many neurotrophic factors.

OECs express glial markers such as glial fibrillary acidic protein, s100, and p75, and radial glial markers such as nestin and vimentin, which may further assist researchers with understanding the labeling characteristics of these specialized glia.

== Olfactory system regeneration ==
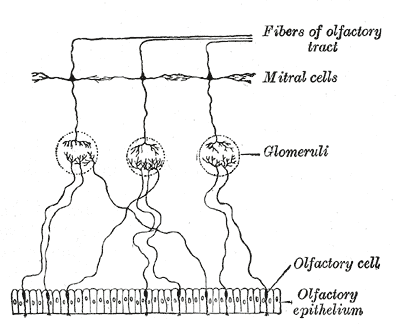
Plan of olfactory neurons

The mammalian olfactory system is unusual in that it has the ability to continuously regenerate its neurons during adulthood. This ability is associated with olfactory ensheathing glia. New olfactory receptor neurons must project their axons through the central nervous system to an olfactory bulb in order to be functional. The growth and regeneration of olfactory axons can be attributed to OECs, as they form the fascicles through which axons grow from the peripheral nervous system into the central nervous system. Olfactory receptor neurons have an average lifespan of 6–8 weeks and therefore must be replaced by cells differentiated from the stem cells that are within a layer at the nearby epithelium's base. Axonal growth is guided by the glial composition and cytoarchitecture of the olfactory bulb in addition to the presence of OECs.

OECs are thought to be in part responsible for the neurogenesis of primary olfactory neurons through the processes of fasciculation, cell sorting, and axonal targeting.

== Role in spinal cord injuries ==
Traumatic spinal cord damage causes a permanent loss of motor and sensory functions in the central nervous system, termed paraplegia or tetraplegia based on the site of the injury. Other detrimental effects may take place in the respiratory system and renal system as a result of the injury. Unlike the peripheral nervous system, the central nervous system is unable to regenerate damaged axons, so its synaptic connections are lost forever. Current treatment is limited and the primary potential methods are either controversial or ineffective. Studies dating back to the 1990s have begun researching the olfactory system of mammals, rats in particular, to gain a greater understanding of axonal regeneration and neurogenesis, and the possible implementation of these cells at the site of the spinal cord injury.

Transplantation of OECs into the spinal cord has become a possible therapy for spinal cord damage and other neural diseases in animal models. Several recent studies have reported that preventing OEC inhibition will present a uniform population of cells in the spinal cord, creating an environment in which damaged axons can be repaired. In October 2014, the Polish firefighter Darek Fidyka became the first paraplegic patient to regain mobility after OEC transplantation.

OECs are similar to Schwann cells in that they provide an upregulation of low-affinity NGF receptor p75 following injury; however, unlike Schwann cells they produce lower levels of neurotrophins. Several studies have shown evidence of OECs being able to support regeneration of lesioned axons, but these results are often unable to be reproduced. Regardless, OECs have been investigated thoroughly in relation to spinal cord injuries, amyotrophic lateral sclerosis, and other neurodegenerative diseases. Researchers suggest that these cells possess a unique ability to remyelinate injured neurons.

=== Peptide-modified gellan gum and OECs ===
Stem cell transplantation has been identified as another possible therapy for axonal regeneration in the central nervous system by delivering these cells directly to the site of the spinal cord injury. Both OECs and neural stem/progenitor cells (NSPCs) have been successfully transplanted in the central nervous system of adult rats and have had either positive or neutral results as a method of neurogenesis and axonal regeneration; however, neither method has been shown to have long term beneficial effects, as cell survival is usually less than 1% after transplantation. The inability of these cells to sustain after transplantation is a result of inflammation, the inability of a sufficient matrix to thrive and create a uniform population of cells, or the migratory response of the cells needed to fully repair the site of the injury. Another current issue with the survival of the cells is utilizing the proper biomaterials to deliver them to the site of the injury.

One study has investigated the use of peptide modified gellan gum as the biomaterial with OECs and neural stem/progenitor cells to provide an environment that will allow these cells to survive after transplantation. Gellan gum hydrogel can be injected in a minimally invasive manner and is approved by the FDA as a food additive because of its chemical structure. The gellan gum was modified with several fibronectin-derived peptide sequences so the transplantation cells have closely related properties to that of native tissue in the extracellular matrix. By mimicking native tissue, the delivery cells are less likely to be rejected by the body and biological functions such as cell adhesion and growth will be enhanced through cell-cell and cell-matrix interactions. In order to determine the possibility of OECs and NPSCs improving cell viability, both cells were co-cultured in direct contact with each other, along with the peptide-modified gellan gum.

The experiment demonstrated that NSPC adhesion, proliferation, and viability are greatly increased when the peptide-modified gellan gum is used as the transplantation device when compared to a gellan gum control. Additionally, the co-culture of OECs and NSPCs shows greater cell survival compared to the cell survival of NSPCs cultured alone. The results provide evidence that this method of cell transplantation is a potential strategy for repairing spinal cord damage in the future.

=== Side effects of cell transplantation ===
A study has shown that cell transplantation may cause an increase in body temperature of a subject with an older injury to the spinal cord. In this experiment, the patients' body temperatures were elevated to those of a moderate fever after transplantation, and lasted approximately 3–4 days. However, the study provides evidence that even past spinal cord injuries can benefit from the neurological functional recovery that stem cell transplantation may provide in the future.

Transplantation of stem cells is also known to cause toxicity and graft-versus-host disease (GVHD). Apoptotic cells have been administered simultaneously with hematopoietic stem cells in experimental transplantation models, in anticipation of an improved outcome. As a result, the combination prevents alloimmunization, up-regulates Regulatory T cells (suppressor T cells) and reduces the severity of GVHD.

=== Infection susceptibility ===
OECs have properties similar to those of astrocytes, both of which have been identified as being susceptible to viral infection.

== Labeling OECs ==
=== Iron oxide particles for MRI ===
As stem cell transplantation is becoming a more prevalent means of treating traumatic spinal cord damage, many processes between the start and end result need to be addressed and made more efficient. By labeling OECs, these cells can be tracked by a magnetic resonance imaging (MRI) device when being dispersed in the central nervous system A recent study made use of a novel type of micron-sized particles of iron oxide (MPIO) to label and track these transport-mediated cells via MRI. The experiment resulted in an OEC labeling efficiency of more than 90% with an MPIO incubation time as short as 6 hours, without affecting cell proliferation, migration and viability. MPIOs have also been successfully transplanted into the vitreous body of adult rat eyes, providing the first detailed protocol for efficient and safe MPIO labeling of OECs for their non-invasive MRI tracking in real time for use in studies of central nervous system repair and axonal regeneration.

== Subpopulations ==
Two distinct subpopulations of OECs have been identified with high or low cell surface expression of low-affinity nerve growth factor receptor (p75).

== See also ==
- Neuroscience
- Neuroglia
- Olfaction
- Olfactory system
- Microglia
- List of distinct cell types in the adult human body
