= Neural tissue engineering =

Use of biomedical engineering to restore or replace nervous system tissue

Neural tissue engineering is a specific sub-field of tissue engineering. Neural tissue engineering is primarily a search for strategies to eliminate inflammation and fibrosis upon implantation of foreign substances. Often foreign substances in the form of grafts and scaffolds are implanted to promote nerve regeneration and to repair nerves of both the central nervous system (CNS) and peripheral nervous system (PNS) due to injury.

== Introduction ==
There are two parts of the nervous system: the central nervous system (CNS) and the peripheral nervous system (PNS). General body functions are supervised by the central nervous system (CNS), which includes the brain and spinal cord. The PNS delivers motor signals to control body activities and receives sensory data from the CNS. The PNS It is made up of nerve fibers arranged into nerves. The PNS's autonomic nervous system (ANS), whose sympathetic and parasympathetic branches preserve homeostasis and regulate involuntary physiological functions.

The "fight-or-flight" reaction is triggered by the sympathetic nervous system (SNS), which is derived from the thoracic and upper lumbar spinal cord. It readies the body for quick reactions under pressure. The parasympathetic nervous system (PSNS), on the other hand, is derived from the brainstem and sacral spinal cord and facilitates normal physiological processes by encouraging rest and energy conservation. One of the main nerves in the PSNS, the vagus nerve, originates in the brainstem and travels throughout the body, affecting different organs. It has sensory and motor fibers. Sensory messages tell the brain what the body is doing, allowing it to maintain homeostasis and control activities. Additionally, the vagus nerve influences emotions and memory through connections to several brain regions.

Neuroimmune Interactions The immune system's role is to identify and protect the body against external chemicals and infections. It is separated into innate and adaptive immunity and consists of immune organs, cells, and active ingredients. Remarkably, under certain circumstances, a variety of non-immune cells can display immunological properties. The immune system and the neurological system, which control body processes, are interdependent. By controlling humoral chemicals on a systemic level, the central nervous system CNS affects the immune system. Sleep and other psychosocial variables can affect immunological responses. Obesity and sleep deprivation, for example, can impair immunity, and long-term stress can erode immunological responses, making people more vulnerable to infections like COVID-19. In diseases like asthma that are made worse by psychological stress or depression, neuroimmune interactions are clearly seen. The immune response can impact brain activity, and neuroendocrine hormones control the release of cytokines. Fever symptoms like drowsiness and decreased appetite are caused by proinflammatory mediators. Immune system organs get autonomic innervation from the peripheral nervous system (PNS), which facilitates specialized communication between the two systems. Comprehensive information on bidirectional crosstalk pathways is frequently lacking, despite evidence of functional links between the neurological and immune systems already in place. lymph nodes are essential components of the immune system because they serve as both collecting places for various immune cells and act as filters for dangerous chemicals. Their well-structured composition promotes efficient immune responses, protecting the body against external chemicals, infections, and malignancies. Regional innervation of lymph nodes involves complex participation from the sympathetic and parasympathetic branches of the autonomic nervous system (ANS). Furthermore, there is afferent innervation, which is in charge of immune responses in particular areas. Through the use of neuropeptides, nociceptors—specialized nerve endings that feel pain—control the immune system. Distinct nerve fibers inside lymph nodes are identified by several markers, such as TH, anti-β2-AR, ChAT, and VAChT. Studies have shown that nerve fibers originate from the hilum, travel along blood vessels, cross medullary areas, and form subscapular plexuses. Some limitations do, however, remain. These include the sparse identification of neurons and nerve fibers, the lack of a thorough examination of fine nerve fibers, the incomplete knowledge of innervation in particular regions, and the inadequate documentation in certain studies of close interactions between immune and non-immune cells and nerve fibers.

Neuroimmune interplays have possible therapeutical approaches Novel approaches focusing on neuroimmune interactions may alter the course of the disease or reduce symptoms. Targeting neuroimmune pathways is a holistic approach that seeks to affect both immune responses and brain functioning. The term "acupuncture" refers to the ancient Chinese medical technique of gently stimulating nociceptors and receptors with tiny needles inserted into certain body sites in order to treat various ailments, including pain and inflammation. The FDA-approved therapy for depression and epilepsy, vagus nerve stimulation (VNS), may also be beneficial for non-neurological conditions such rheumatoid arthritis and inflammatory bowel disease. Chemical therapies, such as peripheral nervous system (PNS) modulation, are being investigated for the treatment of infectious and inflammatory disorders, such as rheumatoid arthritis and issues associated with diabetes. Targeting tumor innervation is being explored as a potential new treatment approach. Intratumoral innervation, which involves nerves inside or around tumors, influences the biology of cancer. Peripheral neuropathy is one of the PNS-associated disorders that can be treated with immunotherapy manipulation. According to many experimental researchers, extensive clinical studies are necessary to confirm the safety, effectiveness, and regulatory approval of these experimental techniques prior to their establishment as established therapies.

Tissue Engineering The need for neural tissue engineering arises from the difficulty of the nerve cells and neural tissues to regenerate on their own after neural damage has occurred. The PNS has some, but limited, regeneration of neural cells. Adult stem cell neurogenesis in the CNS has been found to occur in the hippocampus, the subventricular zone (SVZ), and spinal cord. CNS injuries can be caused by stroke, neurodegenerative disorders, trauma, or encephalopathy. A few methods currently being investigated to treat CNS injuries are: implanting stem cells directly into the injury site, delivering morphogens to the injury site, or growing neural tissue in vitro with neural stem or progenitor cells in a 3D scaffold. Proposed use of electrospun polymeric fibrous scaffolds for neural repair substrates dates back to at least 1986 in a NIH SBIR application from Simon. For the PNS, a severed nerve can be reconnected and reinnervated using grafts or guidance of the existing nerve through a channel.

Recent research into creating miniature cortexes, known as corticopoiesis, and brain models, known as cerebral organoids, are techniques that could further the field of neural tissue regeneration. The native cortical progenitors in corticopoiesis are neural tissues that could be effectively embedded into the brain. Cerebral organoids are 3D human pluripotent stem cells developed into sections of the brain cortex, showing that there is a potential to isolate and develop certain neural tissues using neural progenitors.

Another situation that calls for implanting of foreign tissue is use of recording electrodes. Chronic Electrode Implants are a tool being used in research applications to record signals from regions of the cerebral cortex. Research into the stimulation of PNS neurons in patients with paralysis and prosthetics could further the knowledge of reinnervation of neural tissue in both the PNS and the CNS. This research is capable of making one difficult aspect of neural tissue engineering, functional innervation of neural tissue, more manageable.

== CNS ==
=== Causes of CNS injury ===
There are four main causes of CNS injury: stroke, traumatic brain injury (TBI), brain tumors, or developmental complications. Strokes are classified as either hemorrhagic (when a vessel is damaged to the point of bleeding into the brain) or ischemic (when a clot blocks the blood flow through the vessel in the brain). When a hemorrhage occurs, blood seeps into the surrounding tissue, resulting in tissue death, while ischemic hemorrhages result in a lack of blood flow to certain tissues. Traumatic brain injury is caused by external forces impacting the cranium or the spinal cord. Problems with CNS development results in abnormal tissue growth during development, thus decreasing the function of the CNS.

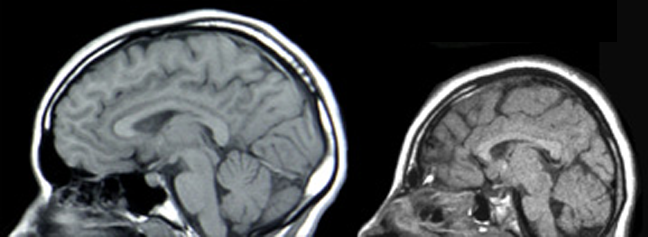
Normal Brain Development (left), Microcephaly, a type of encephalopathy (right)

=== CNS treatments and research ===
==== Implantation of stem cells to the injury site ====
One method to treat CNS injury involves culturing stem cells in vitro and implanting the non-directed stem cells into the brain injury site. Implanting stem cells directly into the injury site prevents glial scar formation and promotes neurogenesis originating from the patient, but also runs the risk of tumor development, inflammation, and migration of the stem cells out of the injury location. Tumorigenesis can occur due to the uncontrolled nature of the stem cell differentiation, inflammation can occur due to rejection of the implanted cells by the host cells, and the highly migratory nature of stem cells results in the cells moving away from the injury site, thus not having the desired effect on the injury site. Other concerns of neural tissue engineering include establishing safe sources of stem cells and getting reproducible results from treatment to treatment.

Alternatively, these stem cells can act as carriers for other therapies, though the positive effects of using stem cells as a delivery mechanism has not been confirmed. Direct stem cell delivery has an increased beneficial effect if they are directed to be neuronal cells in vitro. This way, the risks associated with undirected stem cells are decreased; additionally, injuries that do not have a specific boundary could be treated efficiently.

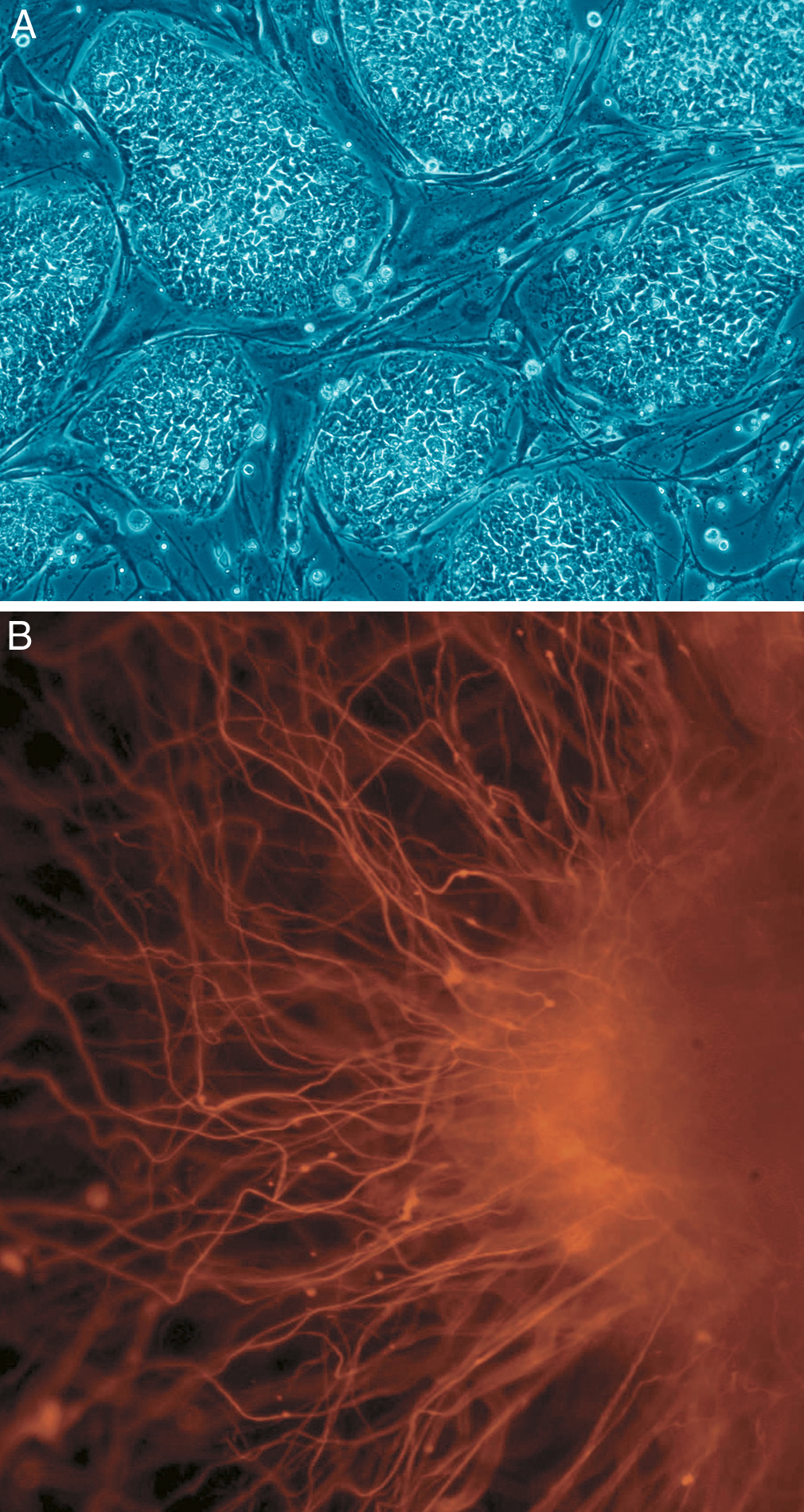
Human embryonic stem colonies (A), axonal outgrowths (B)

==== Delivery of molecules to the injury site ====
Molecules that promote the regeneration of neural tissue, including pharmaceutical drugs, growth factors known as morphogens, and miRNA can also be directly introduced to the injury site of the damaged CNS tissue. Neurogenesis has been seen in animals that are treated with psychotropic drugs through the inhibition of serotonin reuptake and induction of neurogenesis in the brain. When stem cells are differentiating, the cells secrete morphogens such as growth factors to promote healthy development. These morphogens help maintain homeostasis and neural signaling pathways, and they can be delivered into the injury site to promote the growth of the injured tissues. Currently, morphogen delivery has minimal benefits because of the interactions the morphogens have with the injured tissue. Morphogens that are not innate in the body have a limited effect on the injured tissue due to the physical size and their limited mobility within CNS tissue. To be an effective treatment, the morphogens must be present at the injury site at a specific and constant concentration. miRNA has also been shown to affect neurogenesis by directing the differentiation of undifferentiated neural cells.

==== Implantation of neural tissue developed in vitro ====
A third method for treating CNS injuries is to artificially create tissue outside of the body to implant into the injury site. This method could treat injuries that consist of large cavities, where larger amounts of neural tissue needs to be replaced and regenerated. Neural tissue is grown in vitro with neural stem or progenitor cells in a 3D scaffold, forming embryoid bodies (EBs). These EBs consist of a sphere of stem cells, where the inner cells are undifferentiated neural cells, and the surrounding cells are increasingly more differentiated. 3D scaffolds are used to transplant tissue to the injury site and to make the appropriate interface between the artificial and the brain tissue. The scaffolds must be: biocompatible, biodegradable, fit injury site, similar to existing tissue in elasticity and stiffness, and support growing cells and tissues. The combination of using directed stem cells and scaffolds to support the neural cells and tissues increase the survival of the stem cells in the injury site, increasing the efficacy of the treatment.

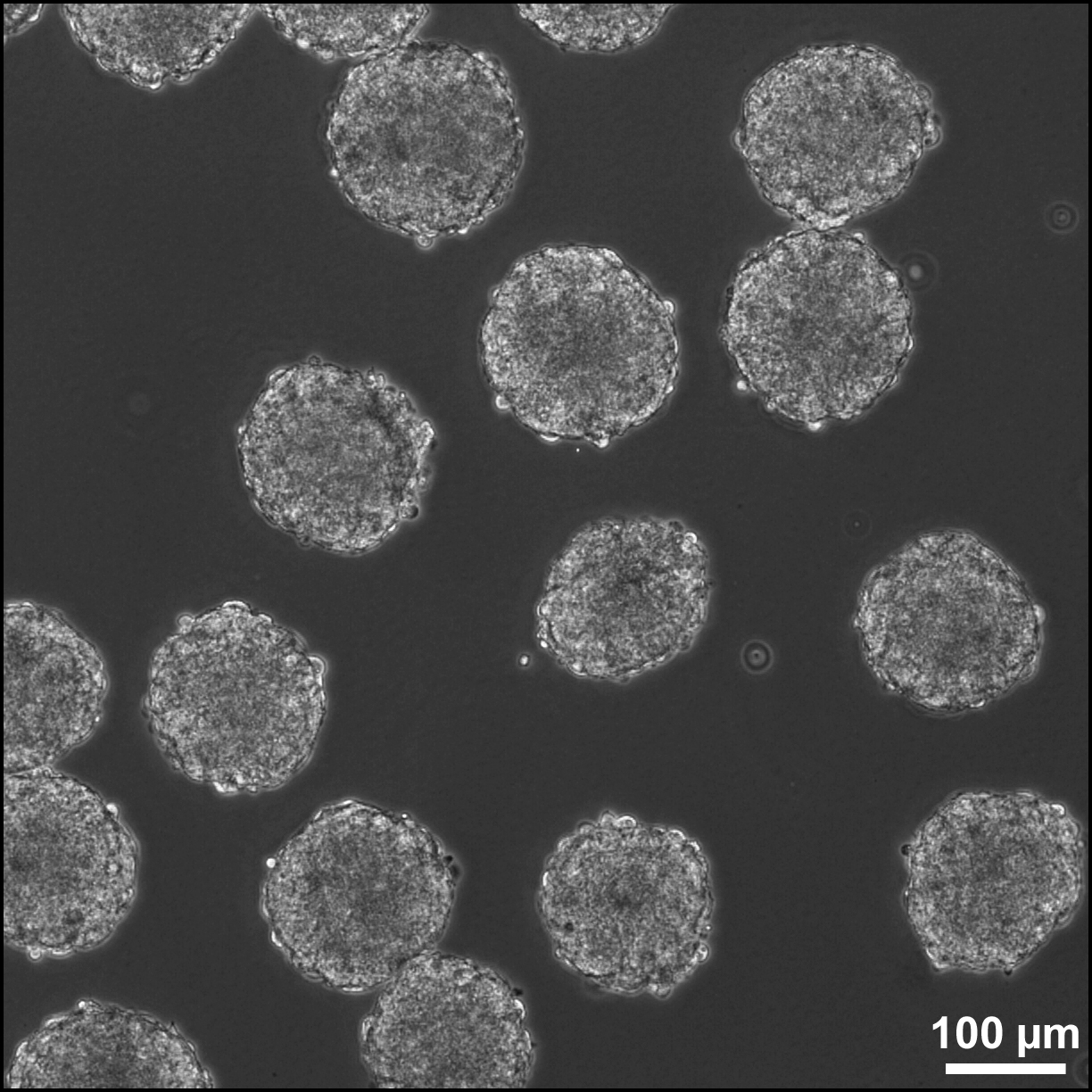
Mouse Embryonic Stem Cells (mESCs) embryoid bodies (EBs)

There are 6 different types of scaffolds that are being researched to use in this method for treating neural tissue injury:

- Liquid hydrogels are cross-linked hydrophobic polymer chains, and the neural stem cells are either grown on the surface of the gel or integrated into the gel during cross-linking of the polymer chains. The major drawback of liquid hydrogels is there is limited protection of the cells that are transplanted.
- Supportive scaffolds are made from solid bead-shaped or microporous structures, and can act as carriers for the transplanted cells or for the growth factors that the stem cells secrete when they are differentiating. The cells adhere to the surface of the matrix in 2D layers. The supportive scaffolds are easily transplanted into the brain injury site because of the scaffold size. They provide a matrix promoting cell adhesion and aggregation, thus increasing increased healthy cell culture.
- Aligning scaffolds can be silk-based, polysaccharide-based, or based on other materials such as a collagen-rich hydrogel. These gels are now enhanced with micro-patterns on the surface for the promotion of neuronal outgrowths. These scaffolds are primarily used for regeneration that needs to occur in a specific orientation, such as in spinal cord injuries.
- Integrative scaffolds are mainly used to protect the transplanted cells from mechanical forces that they are exposed to in the process of implantation into the site of the injury. These scaffolds also decrease the likelihood of having the inflammatory cells located at the site of the injury migrate into the scaffold with the stem cells. Blood vessels have been observed to grow through the scaffold, thus the scaffold and cells are being integrated into the host tissue.
- A combination of engineered scaffolds presents an option for a 3D scaffold that can have both the necessary patterns for cell adhesion and the flexibility to adapt to the ever changing environment at the injury site. Decellularized ECM scaffolds is an option for scaffolds because they more closely mimc the native tissue, but these scaffolds can only currently be harvested from amputations and cadavers.

These 3D scaffolds can be fabricated using particulate leaching, gas foaming, fiber bonding, solvent casting, or electrospinning techniques; each technique creates a scaffold with different properties than the other techniques.

Incorporation success of 3D scaffolds into the CNS has been shown to depend on the stage at which the cells have differentiated. Later stages provide a more efficient implantation, while earlier staged cells need to be exposed to factors that coerce the cells to differentiate and thus respond appropriately to the signals the cells will receive at the CNS injury site. Brain-derived neurotrophic factor is a potential co-factor to promote functional activation of ES cell-derived neurons into the CNS injury sites.

== PNS ==
=== Causes of PNS injury ===
Trauma to the PNS can cause damage as severe as a severance of the nerve, splitting the nerve into a proximal and distal section. The distal nerve degenerates over time due to inactivity, while the proximal end swells over time. The distal end does not degenerate right away, and the swelling of the proximal end does not render it nonfunctional, so methods to reestablish the connection between the two ends of the nerve are being investigated.

=== PNS treatments and research ===
==== Surgical reconnection ====
One method to treat PNS injury is surgical reconnection of the severed nerve by taking the two ends of the nerve and suturing them together. When suturing the nerves together, the fascicles of the nerve are each reconnected, bridging the nerve back together. Though this method works for severances that create a small gap between the proximal and distal nerve ends, this method does not work over gaps of greater distances due to the tension that must be put on the nerve endings. This tension results in the nerve degeneration, and therefore the nerve cannot regenerate and form a functional neural connection.

==== Tissue grafts ====
Tissue grafts utilize nerves or other materials to bridge the two ends of the severed nerve. There are three categories of tissue grafts: autologous tissue grafts, nonautologous tissue grafts, and acellular grafts.

Autologous tissue grafts transplant nerves from a different part of the body of the patient to fill the gap between either end of the injured nerve. These nerves are typically cutaneous nerves, but other nerves have been researched as well with encouraging results. These autologous nerve grafts are the current gold standard for PNS nerve grafting because of the highly biocompatible nature of the autologous nerve graft, but there are issues concerning harvesting the nerve from the patients themselves and being able to store a large amount of autologous grafts for future use.

Nonautologous and acellular grafts (including ECM-based materials) are tissues that do not come from the patient, but instead can be harvested from cadavers (known as allogenic tissue) or animals (known as xenogeneic tissue). While these tissues have an advantage over autologous tissue grafts because the tissue does not need to be taken from the patient, difficulty arises with the potential of disease transmission and thus immunogenic problems. Methods of eliminating the immunogenic cells, thus leaving behind only the ECM-components of the tissue, are currently being investigated to increase the efficacy of nonautologous tissue grafts.

==== Guidance ====
Regeneration with guidance in zebrafish peripheral axons

Guidance methods of PNS regeneration use nerve guide channels to help axons regrow along the correct path, and may direct growth factors secreted by both ends of the nerve to promote growth and reconnection. Guidance methods reduce scarring of the nerves, increasing the functionality of the nerves to transmit action potentials after reconnection. Two types of materials are used in guidance methods of PNS regeneration: natural-based materials and synthetic materials.

Natural-based materials are modified scaffolds stemming from ECM components and glycosaminoglycans. Laminin, collagen, and fibronectin, which are all ECM components, guide axonal development and promote neural stimulation and activity. Other molecules that have the potential to promote nerve repair are: hyaluronic acid, fibrinogen, fibrin gels, self-assembling peptide scaffolds, alginate, agarose, and chitosan.

Synthetic materials also provide another method for tissue regeneration in which the graft's chemical and physical properties can be controlled. Since the properties of a material may be specified for the situation in which it is being used, synthetic materials are an attractive option for PNS regeneration. The use of synthetic materials come with certain concerns, such as: easy formation of the graft material into the necessary dimensions, biodegradable, sterilizable, tear resistant, easy to operate with, low risk of infection, and low inflammation response due to the material. The material must also maintain the channel during the nerve regeneration. Currently, the materials most commonly researched mainly focus on polyesters, but biodegradable polyurethane, other polymers, and biodegradable glass are also being investigated. Other possibilities for synthetic materials are conducting polymers and polymers biologically modified to promote cell axon growth and maintain the axon channel.

== Neuroimmune Enhancement Through EVs ==
Extracellular vesicles (EVs) are bilayer-bound lipid particles that participate in intercellular communication by releasing a variety of substances, including nucleic acids, lipids, and proteins. Exosomes, macrovesicles, and apoptotic bodies are the three primary forms; each has unique properties. EVs have the potential to be used as therapeutic delivery vehicles and diagnostic biomarkers and play roles in immunological responses, cancer, tissue regeneration, and neurological diseases. Damaged neurons generate neuron-derived exosomes (NDEs), which can influence target cells by transferring a variety of cargos, including the Zika virus. Neurodegenerative illnesses are linked to NDEs. Immune cell exosomes (IEEs) have the potential to be used in immunotherapy and vaccine development since they influence immune responses and interact with other cells. Immune cells such as DCs, macrophages, B cells, and T cells produce IEEs. EVs have been shown to promote neuroimmune crosstalk, allowing for both local and distant tissue and cell communication.

== Difficulty of research ==
Because there are so many factors that contribute to the success or failure of neural tissue engineering, there are many difficulties that arise in using neural tissue engineering to treat CNS and PNS injuries. First, the therapy needs to be delivered to the site of the injury. This means that the injury site needs to be accessed by surgery or drug delivery. Both of these methods have inherent risks and difficulties in themselves, compounding the problems associated with the treatments. A second concern is keeping the therapy at the site of the injury. Stem cells have a tendency to migrate out of the injury site to other sections of the brain, thus the therapy is not as effective as it could be as when the cells stay at the injury site. Additionally, the delivery of stem cells and other morphogens to the site of injury can cause more harm than good if they induce tumorigenesis, inflammation, or other unforeseen effects. Finally, the findings in laboratories may not translate to practical clinical treatments. Treatments are successful in a lab, or even an animal model of the injury, may not be effective in a human patient.

== Related research ==
=== Modeling brain tissue development in vitro ===
Two models for brain tissue development are cerebral organoids and corticopoiesis. These models provide an "in vitro" model for normal brain development, but they can be manipulated to represent neural defects. Therefore, the mechanisms behind healthy and malfunctioning development can be studied by researchers using these models. These tissues can be made with either mouse embryonic stem cells (ESC)s or human ESCs. Mouse ESCs are cultured in a protein called Sonic Hedgehog inhibitor to promote the development of dorsal forebrain and study cortical fate. This method has been shown to produce axonal layers that mimic a broad range of cortical layers. Human ESC-derived tissues use pluripotent stem cells to form tissues on scaffold, forming human EBs. These human ESC-derived tissues are formed by culturing human pluripotent EBs in a spinning bioreactor.

=== Targeted reinnervation ===
Targeted reinnervation is a method to reinnervate the neural connections in the CNS and PNS, specifically in paralyzed patients and amputees using prosthetic limbs. Currently, devices are being investigated that take in and record the electrical signals that are propagated through neurons in response to a person's intent to move. This research could shed light on how to reinnervate the neural connections between severed PNS nerves and the connections between the transplanted 3D scaffolds into the CNS.
