= Nerve guidance conduit =

Method of nerve regeneration

A nerve guidance conduit (also referred to as an artificial nerve conduit or artificial nerve graft, as opposed to an autograft) is an artificial means of guiding axonal regrowth to facilitate nerve regeneration and is one of several clinical treatments for nerve injuries. When direct suturing of the two stumps of a severed nerve cannot be accomplished without tension, the standard clinical treatment for peripheral nerve injuries is autologous nerve grafting. Due to the limited availability of donor tissue and functional recovery in autologous nerve grafting, neural tissue engineering research has focused on the development of bioartificial nerve guidance conduits as an alternative treatment, especially for large defects. Similar techniques are also being explored for nerve repair in the spinal cord but nerve regeneration in the central nervous system poses a greater challenge because its axons do not regenerate appreciably in their native environment.

The creation of artificial conduits is also known as entubulation because the nerve ends and intervening gap are enclosed within a tube composed of biological or synthetic materials. Whether the conduit is in the form of a biologic tube, synthetic tube or tissue-engineered conduit, it should facilitate neurotropic and neurotrophic communication between the proximal and distal ends of the nerve gap, block external inhibitory factors, and provide a physical guidance for axonal regrowth. The most basic objective of a nerve guidance conduit is to combine physical, chemical, and biological cues under conditions that will foster tissue formation.

Materials that have been used to make biologic tubes include blood vessels and skeletal muscles, while nonabsorbable and bioabsorbable synthetic tubes have been made from silicone and polyglycolide respectively. Tissue-engineered nerve guidance conduits are a combination of many elements: scaffold structure, scaffold material, cellular therapies, neurotrophic factors and biomimetic materials. The choice of which physical, chemical and biological cues to use is based on the properties of the nerve environment, which is critical in creating the most desirable environment for axon regeneration. The factors that control material selection include biocompatibility, biodegradability, mechanical integrity, controllability during nerve growth, implantation and sterilization.

== Scaffold topography ==
In tissue engineering, the three main levels of scaffold structure are considered to be:

- the superstructure, the overall shape of the scaffold;
- the microstructure, the cellular level structure of the surface; and
- the nanostructure, the subcellular level structure of the surface.

=== Superstructure ===
The superstructure of a conduit or scaffold is important for simulating in vivo conditions for nerve tissue formation. The extracellular matrix, which is mainly responsible for directing tissue growth and formation, has a complex superstructure created by many interwoven fibrous molecules. Ways of forming artificial superstructure include the use of thermo-responsive hydrogels, longitudinally oriented channels, longitudinally oriented fibers, stretch-grown axons, and nanofibrous scaffolds.

==== Thermo-responsive hydrogels ====
In traumatic brain injury (TBI), a series of damaging events is initiated that lead to cell death and overall dysfunction, which cause the formation of an irregularly-shaped lesion cavity. The resulting cavity causes many problems for tissue-engineered scaffolds because invasive implantation is required, and often the scaffold does not conform to the cavity shape. In order to get around these difficulties, thermo-responsive hydrogels have been engineered to undergo solution-gelation (sol-gel) transitions, which are caused by differences in room and physiological temperatures, to facilitate implantation through in situ gelation and conformation to cavity shape caused, allowing them to be injected in a minimally invasively manner.

Methylcellulose (MC) is a material with well-defined sol-gel transitions in the optimal range of temperatures. MC gelation occurs because of an increase in intra- and inter-molecular hydrophobic interactions as the temperature increases. The sol-gel transition is governed by the lower critical solution temperature (LCST), which is the temperature at which the elastic modulus equals the viscous modulus. The LCST must not exceed physiological temperature (37 °C) if the scaffold is to gel upon implantation, creating a minimally invasive delivery. Following implantation into a TBI lesion cavity or peripheral nerve guidance conduit, MC elicits a minimal inflammatory response. It is also very important for minimally invasive delivery that the MC solution has a viscosity at temperatures below its LCST, which allows it to be injected through a small gauge needle for implantation in in vivo applications. MC has been successfully used as a delivery agent for intra-optical and oral pharmaceutical therapies. Some disadvantages of MC include its limited propensity for protein adsorption and neuronal cellular adhesion making it a non-bioactive hydrogel. Due to these disadvantages, use of MC in neural tissue regeneration requires attaching a biologically active group onto the polymer backbone in order to enhance cell adhesion.

Another thermo-responsive gel is one that is formed by combining chitosan with glycerophosphate (GP) salt. This solution experiences gelation at temperatures above 37 °C. Gelation of chitosan/GP is rather slow, taking half an hour to initially set and 9 more hours to completely stabilize. Gel strength varies from 67 to 1572 Pa depending on the concentration of chitosan; the lower end of this range approaches the stiffness of brain tissue. Chitosan/GP has shown success in vitro, but the addition of polylysine is needed to enhance nerve cell attachment. Polylysine was covalently bonded to chitosan in order to prevent it from diffusing away. Polylysine was selected because of its positive nature and high hydrophilicity, which promotes neurite growth. Neuron survival was doubled, though neurite outgrowth did not change with the added polylysine.

==== Longitudinally oriented channels ====
Longitudinally oriented channels are macroscopic structures that can be added to a conduit in order to give the regenerating axons a well-defined guide for growing straight along the scaffold. In a scaffold with microtubular channel architecture, regenerating axons are able to extend through open longitudinal channels as they would normally extend through endoneurial tubes of peripheral nerves. Additionally, the channels increase the surface area available for cell contact. The channels are usually created by inserting a needle, wire, or second polymer solution within a polymer scaffold; after stabilizing the shape of the main polymer, the needle, wire, or second polymer is removed in order to form the channels. Typically multiple channels are created; however, the scaffold can consist of just one large channel, which is simply one hollow tube.

A molding technique was created by Wang et al. for forming a nerve guidance conduit with a multi-channel inner matrix and an outer tube wall from chitosan. In their 2006 study, Wang et al. threaded acupuncture needles through a hollow chitosan tube, where they are held in place by fixing, on either end, patches created using CAD. A chitosan solution is then injected into the tube and solidified, after which the needles are removed, creating longitudinally oriented channels. A representative scaffold was then created for characterization with 21 channels using acupuncture needles of 400 μm in diameter. Upon investigation under a microscope, the channels were found to be approximately circular with slight irregularities; all channels were aligned with the inner diameter of the outer tube wall. It was confirmed by micro-CT imaging that the channels went through the entire length of the scaffold. Under water absorption, the inner and outer diameters of the scaffold became larger, but the channel diameters did not vary significantly, which is necessary for maintaining the scaffold shape that guides neurite extension. The inner structure provides an increase in compressive strength compared to a hollow tube alone, which can prevent collapse of the scaffold onto growing neurites. Neuro-2a cells were able to growth on the inner matrix of the scaffold, and they oriented along the channels. Although this method has only been tested on chitosan, it can be tailored to other materials.

lyophilizing and wire-heating process is another method of creating longitudinally oriented channels, developed by Huang et al. (2005). A chitosan and acetic acid solution was frozen around nickel-copper (Ni-Cu) wires in a liquid nitrogen trap; subsequently the wires were heated and removed. Ni-Cu wires were chosen because they have a high resistance level. Temperature-controlled lyophilizers were used to sublimate the acetic acid. There was no evidence of the channels merging or splitting. After lyophilizing, scaffold dimensions shrunk causing channels to be a bit smaller than the wire used. The scaffolds were neutralized to a physiological pH value using a base, which had dramatic effects on the porous structure. Weaker bases kept the porous structure uniform, but stronger base made it uncontrollable. The technique used here can be slightly modified to accommodate other polymers and solvents.

Another way to create longitudinally oriented channels is to create a conduit from one polymer with embedded longitudinally oriented fibers from another polymer; then selectively dissolve the fibers to form longitudinally oriented channels. Polycaprolactone (PCL) fibers were embedded in a (Hydroxyethyl)methacrylate (HEMA) scaffold. PCL was chosen over poly (lactic acid) (PLA) and poly (lactic-co-glycolic acid) (PLGA), because it is insoluble in HEMA but soluble in acetone. This is important because HEMA was used for the main conduit material and acetone was used to selectively dissolve the polymer fibers. Extruded PCL fibers were inserted into a glass tube and the HEMA solution was injected. The number of channels created was consistent from batch to batch and the variations in fiber diameter could be reduced by creating a more controlled PCL fiber extrusion system. The channels formed were confirmed to be continuous and homogeneous by examination of porosity variations. This process is safe, reproducible and has controllable dimensions. In a similar study conducted by Yu and Shoichet (2005), HEMA was copolymerized with AEMA to create a P(HEMA-co-AMEA) gel. Polycaprolactone (PCL) fibers were embedded in the gel, and then selectively dissolved by acetone with sonication to create channels. It was found that HEMA in mixture with 1% AEMA created the strongest gels. When compared to scaffolds without channels, the addition of 82–132 channels can provide an approximately 6–9 fold increase in surface area, which may be advantageous for regeneration studies that depend on contact-mediated cues.

Itoh et al. (2003) developed a scaffold consisting of a single large longitudinally oriented channel was created using chitosan tendons from crabs. Tendons were harvested from crabs (Macrocheira kaempferi) and repeatedly washed with sodium hydroxide solution to remove proteins and to deacetylate the tendon chitin, which subsequently became known as tendon chitosan. A stainless steel bar with triangular-shaped cross-section (each side 2.1 mm long) was inserted into a hollow tendon chitosan tube of circular-shaped cross-section (diameter: 2 mm; length: 15 mm). When comparing the circular-shaped and triangular-shaped tubes, it was found that the triangular tubes had improved mechanical strength, held their shape better, and increased the surface area available. While this is an effective method for creating a single channel, it does not provide as much surface area for cellular growth as the multi-channel scaffolds.

Newman et al. (2006) inserted conductive and non-conductive fibers into a collagen-TERP scaffold (collagen cross-linked with a terpolymer of poly(N-isopropylacrylamide) (PNiPAAm) ). The fibers were embedded by tightly wrapping them on a small glass slide and sandwiching a collagen-TERP solution between it and another glass slide; spacers between the glass slides set the gel thickness to 800 μm. The conductive fibers were carbon fiber and Kevlar, and the nonconductive fibers were nylon-6 and tungsten wire. Neurites extend in all directions in thick bundles on the carbon fiber; however with the other three fibers, neurites extended in fine web-like conformations. The neurites showed no directional growth on the carbon and Kevlar fibers, but they grew along the nylon-6 fibers and to some extent along the tungsten wire. The tungsten wire and nylon-6 fiber scaffolds had neurites grow into the gel near the fiber-gel interface in addition to growing along the surface. All fiber gels except Kevlar showed a significant increase in neurite extension compared to non-fiber gels. There was no difference in the neurite extension between the non-conductive and the conductive fibers.

In their 2005 study, Cai et al. added Poly (L-lactic acid) (PLLA) microfilaments to hollow poly(lactic acid) (PLA) and silicon tubes. The microfiber guidance characteristics were inversely related to the fiber diameter with smaller diameters promoting better longitudinally oriented cell migration and axonal regeneration. The microfibers also promoted myelination during peripheral nerve repair.

==== Stretch-grown axons ====
Mature axon tracts has been demonstrated to experience growth when mechanically stretched at the central portion of the axon cylinder. Such mechanical stretch was applied by a custom axon stretch-growth bioreactor composed of four main components: custom-designed axon expansion chamber, linear motion table, stepper motor and controller. The nerve tissue culture is placed within the expansion chamber with a port for gas exchange and a removable stretching frame, which is able to separate two groups of somas (neuron cell bodies) and thus stretch their axons. Collagen gel was used to promote the growth of larger stretch-grown axon tracts that were visible to the unaided eye. There are two reasons for the growth enhancement due to the collagen coating: 1) the culture became hydrophobic after the collagen dried, which permitted a denser concentration of neurons to grow, and 2) the collagen coating created an unobstructed coating across the two elongation substrates. Examination by scanning electron microscope and TEM showed no signs of axon thinning due to stretch, and the cytoskeleton appeared to be normal and intact. The stretch-grown axon tracts were cultured on a biocompatible membrane, which could be directly formed into a cylindrical structure for transplantation, eliminating the need to transfer axons to a scaffold after growth was complete. The stretch-grown axons were able to grow at an unprecedented rate of 1 cm/day after only 8 days of acclimation, which is much greater than the 1 mm/day maximal growth rate as measured for growth cone extension. The rate of 1 mm/day is also the average transport speed for structural elements such as neurofilaments.

==== Nanofibers scaffolds ====
Research on nanoscale fibers attempts to mimic the in vivo extracellular environment in order to promote directional growth and regeneration. Three distinct methods for forming nanofibrous scaffolds are self-assembly, phase separation and electrospinning. However, there are many other methods for forming nanofibrous scaffolds.

Self-assembly of nanofibrous scaffolds is able to occur only when the fibers themselves are engineered for self-assembly. One common way to drive the self-assembly of scaffold fibers is to use amphiphilic peptides so that in water the hydrophobic moiety drives the self-assembly. Carefully calculated engineering of the amphiphilic peptides allows for precise control over the self-assembled matrix. Self-assembly is able to create both ordered and unordered topographies. Phillips et al. (2005) developed and tested in vitro and in vivo a self-aligned collagen-Schwann cell matrix, which allowed DRG neurite extension alignment in vitro. Collagen gels have been used extensively as substrates for three-dimensional tissue culture. Cells are able to form integrin-mediated attachments with collagen, which initiates cytoskeleton assembly and cell motility. As cells move along the collagen fibers they generate forces that contract the gel. When the collagen fibers are tethered at both ends, cell-generated forces create uniaxial strain, causing the cells and collagen fibers to align. The advantages of this matrix are its simplicity and speed of preparation. Soluble plasma fibronectin can also self-assemble into stable insoluble fibers when put under direct mechanical shearing within a viscous solution. Phillips et al. (2004) investigated a new method of shear aggregation that causes an improved aggregation. The mechanical shearing was created by dragging out a 0.2 ml bolus to 3 cm with forceps; fibronectin aggregates into insoluble fibers at the rapidly moving interface in an ultrafiltration cell. The proposed mechanism for this fiber aggregation is protein extension and elongation under mechanical shear force, which leads to lateral packing and protein aggregation of fibers. Phillips et al. showed that mechanical shear produced by stretching a high viscosity fibronectin gel causes substantial changes in its structure and that when applied through uniaxial extension, a viscous fibronectin gel forms oriented fibrous fibronectin aggregates; additionally, the fibrous aggregates have a decreased solubility and can support the various cell types in vitro.

Phase separation allows for three-dimensional sub-micrometre fiber scaffolds to be created without the use of specialized equipment. The five steps involved in phase separation are polymer dissolution, phase separation and gelation, solvent extraction from the gel, freezing and freeze drying in water. The final product is a continuous fiber network. Phase separation can be modified to fit many different applications, and pore structure can be varied by using different solvents, which can change the entire process from liquid–liquid to solid–liquid. Porosity and fiber diameter can also be modified by varying the initial concentration of the polymer; a higher initial concentration leads to less pores and larger fiber diameters. This technique can be used to create networks of fibers with diameters reaching type I collagen fiber diameters. The fibrous network created is randomly oriented and so far work has not been done to attempt to organize the fibers. Phase separation is a widely used technique for creating highly porous nanofibrous scaffolds with ease.

Electrospinning provides a robust platform for development of synthetic nerve guidance conduits. Electrospinning can serve to create scaffolds at controlled dimensions with varying chemistry and topography. Furthermore, different materials can be encapsulated within fibers including particles, growth factors, and even cells. Electrospinning creates fibers by electrically charging a droplet of polymer melt or solution and suspending it from a capillary. Then, an electric field is applied at one end of the capillary until the charge exceeds the surface tension, creating a polymer jet that elongates and thins. This polymer jet discharges as a Taylor cone, leaving behind electrically charged polymers, which are collected on a grounded surface as the solvent as the solvent evaporates from the jets. Fibers have been spun with diameters ranging from less than 3 nm to over 1 μm. The process is affected by system parameters such as polymer type, polymer molecular weight, and solution properties and by process parameters such as flow rate, voltage, capillary diameter, distance between the collector and the capillary, and motion of the collector. The fibrous network created is unordered and contains a high surface-to-volume ratio as a result of a high porosity; a large network surface area is ideal for growth and transport of wastes and nutrients in neural tissue engineering. The two features of electrospun scaffolds that are advantageous for neural tissue engineering are the morphology and architecture, which closely mimics the ECM, and the pores, which are the correct range of sizes that allows nutrient exchange but prevents in growth of glial scar tissue (around 10 μm). Random electrospun PLLA scaffolds have been demonstrated to have increased cell adhesion, which may be due to an increased surface roughness. Chemically modified electrospun fiber mats have also been shown to influence neural stem cell differentiation and increase cell proliferation. In the past decade, scientists have also developed numerous methods for production of aligned nanofiber scaffolds, which serve to provide additional topographic cues to cells. This is advantageous because large scale three-dimensional aligned scaffolds cannot be created easily using traditional fabrication techniques. In a study conducted by Yang et al. (2005), aligned and random electrospun poly (L-lactic acid) (PLLA) microfibrous and nanofibrous scaffolds were created, characterized, and compared. Fiber diameters were directly proportional to the initial polymer concentration used for electrospinning; the average diameter of aligned fibers was smaller than that of random fibers under identical processing conditions. It was shown that neural stem cells elongated parallel to the aligned electrospun fibers. The aligned nanofibers had a longer average neurite length compared to aligned microfibers, random microfibers, and random nanofibers. In addition, more cells differentiated on aligned nanofibers than aligned microfibers. Thus, the results of this study demonstrated that aligned nanofibers may be more beneficial than nonaligned fibers or microfibers for promoting nerve regeneration.

=== Microstructure and nanostructure ===
Microstructure and nanostructure, along with superstructure are three main levels of scaffold structure that deserve consideration when creating scaffold topography. While the superstructure refers to the overall shape of the scaffold, the microstructure refers to the cellular level structure of the surface and the nanostructure refers to the subcellular level structure of the surface. All three levels of structure are capable of eliciting cell responses; however, there is significant interest in the response of cells to nanoscale topography motivated by the presence of numerous nanoscale structures within the extracellular matrix. There are a growing number of methods for the manufacture of micro- and nanostructures (many originating from the semiconductor industry) allowing for the creation of various topographies with controlled size, shape, and chemistry.

==== Physical cues ====
Physical cues are formed by creating an ordered surface structure at the level of the microstructure and/or nanostructure. Physical cues on the nanoscale have been shown to modulate cell adhesion, migration, orientation, contact inhibition, gene expression, and cytoskeletal formation. This allows for the direction of cell processes such as proliferation, differentiation, and spreading. There are numerous methods for the manufacture of micro- and nanoscale topographies, which can be divided into those that create ordered topographies and those that create unordered topographies.

Ordered topographies are defined as patterns that are organized and geometrically precise. Though there are many methods for creating ordered topographies, they are usually time-consuming, requiring skill and experience and the use of expensive equipment.

Photolithography involves exposing a light source to a photoresist-coated silicon wafer; a mask with the desired pattern is place between the light source and the wafer, thereby selectively allowing light to filter through and create the pattern on the photoresist. Further development of the wafer brings out the pattern in the photoresist. Photolithography performed in the near-UV is often viewed as the standard for fabricating topographies on the micro-scale. However, because the lower limit for size is a function of the wavelength, this method cannot be used to create nanoscale features. In their 2005 study, Mahoney et al. created organized arrays of polyimide channels (11 μm in height and 20–60 μm in width) were created on a glass substrate by photolithography. Polyimide was used because it adheres to glass well, is chemically stable in aqueous solution, and is biocompatible. It is hypothesized that the microchannels limited the range of angles that cytoskeletal elements within the neurite growth cones could accumulate, assemble, and orient. There was a significant decrease in the number of neurites emerging from the soma; however, there was less decrease as the range of angles over which the neurites emerged was increased. Also, the neurites were on average two times longer when the neurons were cultured on the microchannels versus the controls on a flat surface; this could be due to a more efficient alignment of filaments.

In electron beam lithography (EBL), an electron-sensitive resist is exposed to a beam of high-energy electrons. There is the choice of a positive or negative type resist; however, lower feature resolution can be obtained with negative resists. Patterns are created by programming the beam of electrons for the exact path to follow along the surface of the material. Resolution is affected by other factors such as electron scattering in the resist and backscattering from the substrate. EBL can create single surface features on the order of 3–5 nm. If multiple features are required over a large surface area, as is the case in tissue engineering, the resolution drops and features can only be created as small as 30–40 nm, and the resist development begins to weigh more heavily on pattern formation. To prevent dissolution of the resist, ultrasonic agitation can be used to overcome intermolecular forces. In addition, isopropyl alcohol (IPA) helps develop high-density arrays. EBL can become a quicker and less costly process by replicating nanometer patterns in polymeric materials; the replication process has been demonstrated with polycaprolactone (PCL) using hot embossing and solvent casting. In a study conducted by Gomez et al. (2007), microchannels 1 and 2 μm wide and 400 and 800 nm deep created by EBL on PDMS were shown to enhance axon formation of hippocampal cells in culture more so than immobilized chemical cues.

X-ray lithography is another method for forming ordered patterns that can be used to investigate the role that topography plays in promoting neuritogenesis. The mask parameters determine the pattern periodicity, but ridge width and depth are determined by the etching conditions. In a study, ridges were created with periods ranging from 400 through 4000 nm, widths ranging from 70 through 1900 nm, and a groove depth of 600 nm; developing neurites demonstrated contact guidance with features as small as 70 nm and greater than 90% of the neurites were within 10 degrees of parallel alignment with the ridges and grooves. There was not a significant difference in orientation with respect to the feature sizes used. The number of neurites per cell was constrained by the ridges and grooves, producing bipolar rather than branching phenotypes.

Unordered topographies are generally created by processes that occur spontaneously during other processing; the patterns are random in orientation and organization with imprecise or no control over feature geometry. The advantage to creating unordered topographies over ordered is that the processes are often less time-consuming, less expensive, and do not require great skill and experience. Unordered topographies can be created by polymer demixing, colloidal lithography and chemical etching.

In polymer demixing, polymer blends experience spontaneous phase separation; it often occurs during conditions such as spin casting onto silicon wafers. Features that can be created by this method include nanoscale pits, islands, and ribbons, which can be controlled to an extent by adjusting the polymer ratio and concentration to change the feature shape and size, respectively. There is not much control in the horizontal direction, though the vertical direction of the features can be precisely controlled. Because the pattern is very unordered horizontally, this method can only be used to study cell interactions with specific height nanotopographies.

Colloidal lithography is inexpensive and can be used to create surfaces with controlled heights and diameters. Nanocolliods are used as an etch mask by spreading them along the material surface, and then ion beam bombardment or film evaporation is used to etch away around the nanocolliods, creating nanocolumns and nanopits, respectively. The final surface structure can be controlled by varying the area covered by colloids and the colloid size. The area covered by the colloids can be changed by modifying the ionic strength of the colloid solution. This technique is able to create large patterned surface areas, which is necessary for tissue engineering applications.

Chemical etching involves soaking the material surface in an etchant such as hydrofluoric acid (HF) or sodium hydroxide (NaOH) until the surface is etched away to a desired roughness as created by pits and protrusions on the nanometer scale. Longer etch times lead to rougher surfaces (i.e., smaller surface pits and protrusions). Structures with specific geometry or organization cannot be created by this rudimentary method because at best it can be considered a surface treatment for changing the surface roughness. The significant advantages of this method are ease of use and low cost for creating a surface with nanotopographies. Silicon wafers were etched using HF, and it was demonstrated that cell adhesion was enhanced only in a specified range of roughness (20–50 nm).

==== Chemical cues ====
In addition to creating topography with physical cues, it can be created with chemical cues by selectively depositing polymer solution in patterns on the surface of a substrate. There are different methods for depositing the chemical cues. Two methods for dispensing chemical solutions include stripe patterning and piezoelectric microdispensing.

Stripe-patterned polymer films can be formed on solid substrates by casting diluted polymer solution. This method is relatively easy, inexpensive, and has no restriction on the scaffold materials that can be used. The procedure involves horizontally overlapping glass plates while keeping them vertically separated by a narrow gap filled with a polymer solution. The upper plate is moved at a constant velocity between 60 and 100 μm/s. A thin liquid film of solution is continuously formed at the edge of the sliding glass following evaporation of the solvent. Stripe patterns prepared at speeds of 60, 70, and 100 μm/s created width and groove spacings of 2.2 and 6.1 μm, 3.6 and 8.4 μm, and 4.3 and 12.7 μm, respectively; the range of heights for the ridges was 50–100 nm. Tsuruma, Tanaka et al. demonstrated that embryonic neural cells cultured on film coated with poly-L-lysine attached and elongated parallel to poly(ε-caprolactone)/chloroform solution (1g/L) stripes with narrow pattern width and spacing (width: 2.2 μm, spacing: 6.1 μm). However, the neurons grew across the axis of the patterns with wide width and spacing (width: 4.3 μm, spacing: 12.7 μm). On average, the neurons on the stripe-patterned films had less neurites per cell and longer neurites compared to the neurons on non-patterned films. Thus, the stripe pattern parameters are able to determine the growth direction, the length of neurites, and the number of neurites per cell.

Microdispensing was used to create micropatterns on polystyrene culture dishes by dispensing droplets of adhesive laminin and non-adhesive bovine serum albumin (BSA) solutions. The microdispenser is a piezoelectric element attached to a push-bar on top of a channel etched in silicon, which has one inlet at each end and a nozzle in the middle. The piezoelectric element expands when voltage is applied, causing liquid to be dispensed through the nozzle. The microdispenser is moved using a computer-controlled x-y table. The micropattern resolution depends on many factors: dispensed liquid viscosity, drop pitch (the distance between the centre of two adjacent droplets in a line or array), and the substrate. With increasing viscosity the lines become thinner, but if the liquid viscosity is too high the liquid cannot be expelled. Heating the solution creates more uniform protein lines. Although some droplet overlap is necessary to create continuous lines, uneven evaporation may cause uneven protein concentration along the lines; this can be prevented through smoother evaporation by modifying the dispensed solution properties.

For patterns containing 0.5 mg/mL laminin, a higher proportion of neurites grew on the microdispensed lines than between the lines. On 10 mg/mL and 1 mg/mL BSA protein patterns and fatty-acid free BSA protein patterns a significant number of neurites avoided the protein lines and grew between the lines. Thus, the fatty-acid-containing BSA lines were just as non-permissive for neurite growth as lines containing BSA with fatty acids. Because microdispensing does not require direct contact with the substrate surfaces, this technique can utilitze surfaces with delicate micro- or nanotopology that could be destroyed by contact. It is possible to vary the amount of protein deposited by dispensing more or less droplets. An advantage of microdispensing is that patterns can be created quickly in 5–10 minutes. Because the piezoelectric microdispenser does not require heating, heat-sensitive proteins and fluids as well as living cells can be dispensed.

== Scaffold material ==
The selection of the scaffold material is perhaps the most important decision to be made. It must be biocompatible and biodegradable; in addition, it must be able to incorporate any physical, chemical, or biological cues desired, which in the case of some chemical cues means that it must have a site available for chemically linking peptides and other molecules. The scaffold materials chosen for nerve guidance conduits are almost always hydrogels. The hydrogel may be composed of either biological or synthetic polymers. Both biological and synthetic polymers have their strengths and weaknesses. The conduit material can cause inadequate recovery when (1) degradation and resorption rates do not match the tissue formation rate, (2) the stress-strain properties do not compare well to those of neural tissue, (3) when degrading swelling occurs, causing significant deformation, (4) a large inflammatory response is elicited, or (5) the material has low permeability.

=== Hydrogel ===
Hydrogels are a class of biomaterials that are chemically or physically cross-linked water-soluble polymers. They can be either degradable or non-degradable as determined by their chemistry, but degradable is more desirable whenever possible. There has been great interest in hydrogels for tissue engineering purposes, because they generally possess high biocompatibility, mechanical properties similar to soft tissue, and the ability to be injected as a liquid that gels. When hydrogels are physically cross-linked they must rely on phase separation for gelation; the phase separation is temperature-dependent and reversible. Some other advantages of hydrogels are that they use only non-toxic aqueous solvents, allow infusion of nutrients and exit of waste products, and allow cells to assemble spontaneously. Hydrogels have low interfacial tension, meaning cells can easily migrate across the tissue-implant boundary. However, with hydrogels it is difficult to form a broad range of mechanical properties or structures with controlled pore size.

=== Synthetic polymer ===
A synthetic polymer may be non-degradable or degradable. For the purpose of neural tissue engineering degradable materials are preferred whenever possible, because long-term effects such as inflammation and scar could severely damage nerve function. The degradation rate is dependent on the molecular weight of the polymer, its crystallinity, and the ratio of glycolic acid to lactic acid subunits. Because of a methyl group, lactic acid is more hydrophobic than glycolic acid causing its hydrolysis to be slower. Synthetic polymers have more wieldy mechanical properties and degradation rates that can be controlled over a wide range, and they eliminate the concern for immunogenicity. There are many different synthetic polymers currently being used in neural tissue engineering. However, the drawbacks of many of these polymers include a lack of biocompatibility and bioactivity, which prevents these polymers from promoting cell attachment, proliferation, and differentiation. Synthetic conduits have only been clinically successful for the repair of very short nerve lesion gaps less than 1–2 cm. Furthermore, nerve regeneration with these conduits has yet to reach the level of functional recovery seen with nerve autografts.

==== Collagen-terpolymer ====
Collagen is a major component of the extracellular matrix, and it is found in the supporting tissues of peripheral nerves. A terpolymer (TERP) was synthesized by free radical copolymerization of its three monomers and cross-linked with collagen, creating a hybrid biological-synthetic hydrogel scaffold. The terpolymer is based on poly(NIPAAM), which is known to be a cell friendly polymer. TERP is used both as a cross-linker to increase hydrogel robustness and as a site for grafting of bioactive peptides or growth factors, by reacting some of its acryloxysuccinimide groups with the –NH2 groups on the peptides or growth factors. Because the collagen-terpolymer (collagen-TERP) hydrogel lacks a bioactive component, a study attached to it a common cell adhesion peptide found in laminin (YIGSR) in order to enhance its cell adhesion properties.

==== Poly (lactic-co-glycolic acid) family ====
The polymers in the PLGA family include poly (lactic acid) (PLA), poly (glycolic acid) (PGA), and their copolymer poly (lactic-co-glycolic acid) (PLGA). All three polymers have been approved by the Food and Drug Administration for employment in various devices. These polymers are brittle and they do not have regions for permissible chemical modification; in addition, they degrade by bulk rather than by surface, which is not a smooth and ideal degradation process. In an attempt to overcome the lack of functionalities, free amines have been incorporated into their structures from which peptides can be tethered to control cell attachment and behavior.

==== Methacrylated dextran (Dex-MA) copolymerized with aminoethyl methacrylate (AEMA) ====
Dextran is a polysaccharide derived from bacteria; it is usually produced by enzymes from certain strains of leuconostoc or Streptococcus. It consists of α-1,6-linked D-glucopyranose residues. Cross-linked dextran hydrogel beads have been widely used as low protein-binding matrices for column chromatography applications and for microcarrier cell culture technology. However, it has not been until recently that dextran hydrogels have been investigated in biomaterials applications and specifically as drug delivery vehicles. An advantage of using dextran in biomaterials applications include its resistance to protein adsorption and cell-adhesion, which allows specific cell adhesion to be determined by deliberately attached peptides from ECM components. AEMA was copolymerized with Dex-MA in order to introduce primary amine groups to provide a site for attachment of ECM-derived peptides to promote cell adhesion. The peptides can be immobilized using sulfo-SMMC coupling chemistry and cysteine-terminated peptides. Copolymerization of Dex-MA with AEMA allowed the macroporous geometry of the scaffolds to be preserved in addition to promoting cellular interactions.

==== Poly(glycerol sebacate) (PGS) ====
A novel biodegradable, tough elastomer has been developed from poly(glycerol sebacate) (PGS) for use in creation of a nerve guidance conduit. PGS was originally developed for soft tissue engineering purposes to specifically mimic ECM mechanical properties. It is considered an elastomer because it is able to recover from deformation in mechanically dynamic environments and to effectively distribute stress evenly throughout regenerating tissues in the form of microstresses. PGS is synthesized by a polycondensation reaction of glycerol and sebacic acid, which can be melt processed or solvent processed into the desired shape. PGS has a Young's modulus of 0.28 MPa and an ultimate tensile strength greater than 0.5 MPa. Peripheral nerve has a Young's modulus of approximately 0.45 MPa, which is very close to that of PGS. Additionally, PGS experiences surface degradation, accompanied by losses in linear mass and strength during resorption. Following implantation, the degradation half-life was determined to be 21 days; complete degradation occurred at day 60. PGS experiences minimal water absorption during degradation and does not have detectable swelling; swelling can cause distortion, which narrows the tubular lumen and can impede regeneration. It is advantageous that the degradation time of PGS can be varied by changing the degree of crosslinking and the ratio of sebacic acid to glycerol. In a study by Sundback et al. (2005), implanted PGS and PLGA conduits had similar early tissue responses; however, PLGA inflammatory responses spiked later, while PGS inflammatory responses continued to decreases.

==== Polyethylene glycol hydrogel ====
Polyethylene glycol (PEG) hydrogels are biocompatible and proven to be tolerated in many tissue types, including the CNS. Mahoney and Anseth formed PEG hydrogels by photopolymerizing methacrylate groups covalently linked to degradable PEG macromers. Hydrogel degradation was monitored over time by measuring mechanical strength (compressive modulus) and average mesh size from swelling ratio data. Initially, the polymer chains were highly cross-linked, but as degradation proceeded, ester bonds were hydrolyzed, allowing the gel to swell; the compressive modulus decreased as the mesh size increased until the hydrogel was completely dissolved. It was demonstrated that neural precursor cells were able to be photoencapsulated and cultured on the PEG gels with minimal cell death. Because the mesh size is initially small, the hydrogel blocks inflammatory and other inhibitory signals from surrounding tissue. As the mesh size increases, the hydrogel is able to serve as a scaffold for axon regeneration.

=== Biological polymers ===
There are advantages to using biological polymers over synthetic polymers. They are very likely to have good biocompatibility and be easily degraded, because they are already present in nature in some form. However, there are also several disadvantages. They have unwieldy mechanical properties and degradation rates that cannot be controlled over a wide range. In addition, there is always the possibility that naturally-derived materials may cause an immune response or contain microbes. In the production of naturally-derived materials there will also be batch-to-batch variation in large-scale isolation procedures that cannot be controlled. Some other problems plaguing natural polymers are their inability to support growth across long lesion gaps due to the possibility of collapse, scar formation, and early re-absorption. Despite all these disadvantages, some of which can be overcome, biological polymers still prove to be the optimal choice in many situations.

==== Polysialic acid (PSA) ====
Polysialic acid (PSA) is a relatively new biocompatible and bioresorbable material for artificial nerve conduits. It is a homopolymer of α2,8-linked sialic acid residues and a dynamically regulated posttranslational modification of the neural cell adhesion molecule (NCAM). Recent studies have demonstrated that polysialylated NCAM (polySia-NCAM) promotes regeneration in the motor system. PSA shows stability under cell culture conditions and allows for induced degradation by enzymes. It has also been discovered recently that PSA is involved in steering processes like neuritogenesis, axonal path finding, and neuroblast migration. Animals with PSA genetically knocked out express a lethal phenotype, which has unsuccessful path finding; nerves connecting the two brain hemispheres were aberrant or missing. Thus PSA is vital for proper nervous system development.

==== Collagen Type I/III ====
Collagen is the major component of the extracellular matrix and has been widely used in nerve regeneration and repair. Due to its smooth microgeometry and permeability, collagen gels are able to allow diffusion of molecules through them. Collagen resorption rates are able to be controlled by crosslinking collagen with polypoxy compounds. Additionally, collagen type I/III scaffolds have demonstrated good biocompatibility and are able to promote Schwann cell proliferation. However, collagen conduits filled with Schwann cells used to bridge nerve gaps in rats have shown surprisingly unsuccessful nerve regeneration compared to nerve autografts. This is because biocompatibility is not the only factor necessary for successful nerve regeneration; other parameters such as inner diameter, inner microtopography, porosity, wall thickness, and Schwann cell seeding density will need to be examined in future studies in order to improve the results obtained by these collagen I/III gels.

==== Spider silk fiber ====
Spider silk fibers are shown to promote cellular adhesion, proliferation, and vitality. Allmeling, Jokuszies et al. showed that Schwann cells attach quickly and firmly to the silk fibers, growing in a bipolar shape; proliferation and survival rates were normal on the silk fibers.

They used spider silk fibers to create a nerve conduit with Schwann cells and acellularized xenogenic veins. The Schwann cells formed columns along the silk fibers in a short amount of time, and the columns were similar to bands of Bungner that grow in vivo after PNS injury. Spider silk has not been used in tissue engineering until now because of the predatory nature of spiders and the low yield of silk from individual spiders. It has been discovered that the species Nephila clavipes produces silk that is less immunogenic than silkworm silk; it has a tensile strength of 4 x 109 N/m, which is six times the breaking strength of steel. Because spider silk is proteolytically degraded, there is not a shift in pH from the physiological pH during degradation. Other advantages of spider silk include its resistance to fungal and bacterial decomposition for weeks and the fact that it does not swell. Also, the silk's structure promotes cell adhesion and migration. However, silk harvest is still a tedious task and the exact composition varies among species and even among individuals of the same species depending on diet and environment. There have been attempts to synthetically manufacture spider silk. Further studies are needed to test the feasibility of using a spider silk nerve conduit in vitro and in vivo.

==== Silkworm silk fibroin ====
In addition to spiders, silkworms are another source of silk. Protein from Bombyx mori silkworms is a core of fibroin protein surrounded by sericin, which is a family of glue-like proteins. Fibroin has been characterized as a heavy chain with a repeated hydrophobic and crystallizable sequence: Gly-Ala-Gly-Ala-Gly-X (X stands for Ser or Tyr). The surrounding sericin is more hydrophilic due to many polar residues, but it does still have some hydrophobic β-sheet portions. Silks have been long been used as sutures due to their high mechanical strength and flexibility as well as permeability to water and oxygen. In addition, silk fibroin can be easily manipulated and sterilized. However, silk use halted when undesirable immunological reactions were reported. Recently, it has been discovered that the cause of the immunological problems lies solely with the surrounding sericin. Since this discovery, silk with the sericin removed has been used in many pharmaceutical and biomedical applications. Because it is necessary to remove the sericin from around the fibroin before the silk can be used, an efficient procedure needs to be developed for its removal, which is known as degumming. One degumming method uses boiling aqueous Na_{2}CO_{3} solution, which removes the sericin without damaging the fibroin. Yang, Chen et al. demonstrated that the silk fibroin and silk fibroin extract fluid show good biocompatibility with Schwann cells, with no cytotoxic effects on proliferation.

==== Chitosan ====
Chitosan and chitin belong to a family of biopolymers composed of β(1–4)-linked N-acetyl-D-glucosamine and D-glucosamine subunits. Chitosan is formed by alkaline N-deacetylation of chitin, which is the second most abundant natural polymer after cellulose. Chitosan is a biodegradable polysaccharide that has been useful in many biomedical applications such as a chelating agent, drug carrier, membrane, and water treatment additive. Chitosan is soluble in dilute aqueous solutions, but precipitates into a gel at a neutral pH. It does not support neural cell attachment and proliferation well, but can be enhanced by ECM-derived peptide attachment. Chitosan also contains weak mechanical properties, which are more challenging to overcome.

Degree of acetylation (DA) for soluble chitosan ranges from 0% to 60%, depending on processing conditions. A study was conducted to characterize how varying DA affects the properties of chitosan. Varying DA was obtained using acetic anhydride or alkaline hydrolysis. It was found that decreasing acetylation created an increase in compressive strength. Biodegradation was examined by use of lysozyme, which is known to be mainly responsible for degrading chitosan in vivo by hydrolyzing its glycosidic bonds and is released by phagocytic cells after nerve injury. The results reveal that there was an accelerated mass loss with intermediate DAs, compared with high and low DAs over the time period studied. When DRG cells were grown on the N-acetylated chitosan, cell viability decreased with increasing DA. Also, chitosan has an increasing charge density with decreasing DA, which is responsible for greater cell adhesion. Thus, controlling the DA of chitosan is important for regulating the degradation time. This knowledge could help in the development of a nerve guidance conduit from chitosan.

==== Aragonite ====
Aragonite scaffolds have recently been shown to support the growth of neurons from rat hippocampi. Shany et al. (2006) proved that aragonite matrices can support the growth of astrocytic networks in vitro and in vivo. Thus, aragonite scaffolds may be useful for nerve tissue repair and regeneration. It is hypothesized that aragonite-derived Ca^{2+} is essential for promoting cell adherence and cell–cell contact. This is probably carried out through the help of Ca^{2+}-dependent adhesion molecules such as cadherins. Aragonite crystalline matrices have many advantages over hydrogels. They have larger pores, which allows for better cell growth, and the material is bioactive as a result of releasing Ca^{2+}, which promotes cell adhesion and survival. In addition, the aragonite matrices have higher mechanical strength than hydrogels, allowing them to withstand more pressure when pressed into an injured tissue.

==== Alginate ====
Alginate is a polysaccharide that readily forms chains; it can be cross-linked at its carboxylic groups with multivalent cations such as Cu^{2+}, Ca^{2+}, or Al^{3+} to form a more mechanically stable hydrogel. Calcium alginates form polymers that are both biocompatible and non-immunogenic and have been used in tissue engineering applications. However, they are unable to support longitudinally oriented growth, which is necessary for reconnection of the proximal end with its target. In order to overcome this problem, anisotropic capillary hydrogels (ACH) have been developed. They are created by superimposing aqueous solutions of sodium alginate with aqueous solutions of multivalent cations in layers. After formation, the electrolyte ions diffuse into the polymer solution layers, and a dissipative convective process causes the ions to precipitate, creating capillaries. The dissipative convective process results the opposition of diffusion gradients and friction between the polyelectrolyte chains. The capillary walls are lined with the precipitated metal alginate, while the lumen is filled with the extruded water.

Prang et al. (2006) assessed the capacity of ACH gels to promote directed axonal regrowth in the injured mammalian CNS. The multivalent ions used to create the alginate-based ACH gels were copper ions, whose diffusion into the sodium alginate layers created hexagonally structured anisotropic capillary gels. After precipitation, the entire gel was traversed by longitudinally oriented capillaries. The ACH scaffolds promoted adult NPC survival and highly oriented axon regeneration. This is the first instance of using alginates to produce anisotropic structured capillary gels. Future studies are need to study the long-term physical stability of the ACH scaffolds, because CNS axon regeneration can take many months; however, in addition to being able to provide long-term support the scaffolds must also be degradable. Of all the biological and synthetic biopolymers investigated by Prang et al. (2006), only agarose-based gels were able to compare with the linear regeneration caused by ACH scaffolds. Future studies will also need to investigate whether the ACH scaffolds allow for reinnervation of the target in vivo after a spinal cord injury.

==== Hyaluronic acid hydrogel ====
Hyaluronic acid (HA) is a widely used biomaterial as a result of its excellent biocompatibility and its physiologic function diversity. It is abundant in the extracellular matrix (ECM) where it binds large glycosaminoglycans (GAGs) and proteoglycans through specific HA-protein interactions. HA also binds cell surface receptors such as CD44, which results in the activation of intracellular signaling cascades that regulate cell adhesion and motility and promote proliferation and differentiation. HA is also known to support angiogenesis because its degradation products stimulate endothelial cell proliferation and migration. Thus, HA plays a pivotal role in maintaining the normal processes necessary for tissue survival. Unmodified HA has been used in clinical applications such as ocular surgery, wound healing, and plastic surgery. HA can be crosslinked to form hydrogels. HA hydrogels that were either unmodified or modified with laminin were implanted into an adult central nervous system lesion and tested for their ability to induce neural tissue formation in a study by Hou et al.. They demonstrated the ability to support cell ingrowth and angiogenesis, in addition to inhibiting glial scar formation. Also, the HA hydrogels modified with laminin were able to promote neurite extension. These results support HA gels as a promising biomaterial for a nerve guidance conduit.

== Cellular therapies ==
In addition to scaffold material and physical cues, biological cues can also be incorporated into a bioartificial nerve conduit in the form of cells. In the nervous system there are many different cell types that help support the growth and maintenance of neurons. These cells are collectively termed glial cells. Glial cells have been investigated in an attempt to understand the mechanisms behind their abilities to promote axon regeneration. Three types of glial cells are discussed: Schwann cells, astrocytes, and olfactory ensheathing cells. In addition to glial cells, stem cells also have potential benefit for repair and regeneration because many are able to differentiate into neurons or glial cells. This article briefly discusses the use of adult, transdifferentiated mesenchymal, ectomesenchymal, neural and neural progenitor stem cells.

=== Glial cells ===
Glial cells are necessary for supporting the growth and maintenance of neurons in the peripheral and central nervous system. Most glial cells are specific to either the peripheral or central nervous system. Schwann cells are located in the peripheral nervous system where they myelinate the axons of neurons. Astrocytes are specific to the central nervous system; they provide nutrients, physical support, and insulation for neurons. They also form the blood brain barrier. Olfactory ensheathing cells, however, cross the CNS-PNS boundary, because they guide olfactory receptor neurons from the PNS to the CNS.

==== Schwann cells ====
Schwann cells (SC) are crucial to peripheral nerve regeneration; they play both structural and functional roles. Schwann cells are responsible for taking part in both Wallerian degeneration and bands of Bungner. When a peripheral nerve is damaged, Schwann cells alter their morphology, behavior and proliferation to become involved in Wallerian degeneration and Bungner bands. In Wallerian degeneration, Schwann cells grow in ordered columns along the endoneurial tube, creating a band of Bungner (boB) that protects and preserves the endoneurial channel. Additionally, they release neurotrophic factors that enhance regrowth in conjunction with macrophages. There are some disadvantages to using Schwann cells in neural tissue engineering; for example, it is difficult to selectively isolate Schwann cells and they show poor proliferation once isolated. One way to overcome this difficulty is to artificially induce other cells such as stem cells into SC-like phenotypes.

Eguchi et al. (2003) have investigated the use of magnetic fields in order to align Schwann cells. They used a horizontal type superconducting magnet, which produces an 8 T field at its center. Within 60 hours of exposure, Schwann cells aligned parallel to the field; during the same interval, Schwann cells not exposed oriented in a random fashion. It is hypothesized that differences in magnetic field susceptibility of membrane components and cytoskeletal elements may cause the magnetic orientation. Collagen fibers were also exposed to the magnetic field, and within 2 hours, they aligned perpendicular to the magnetic field, while collagen fibers formed a random meshwork pattern without magnetic field exposure. When cultured on the collagen fibers, Schwann cells aligned along the magnetically oriented collagen after two hours of 8-T magnetic field exposure. In contrast, the Schwann cells randomly oriented on the collagen fibers without magnetic field exposure. Thus, culture on collagen fibers allowed Schwann cells to be oriented perpendicular to the magnetic field and oriented much quicker.

These findings may be useful for aligning Schwann cells in a nervous system injury to promote the formation of bands of Bungner, which are crucial for maintaining the endoneurial tube that guides the regrowing axons back to their targets. It is nearly impossible to align Schwann cells by external physical techniques; thus, the discovery of an alternative technique for alignment is significant. However, the technique developed still has its disadvantages, namely that it takes a considerable amount of energy to sustain the magnetic field for extended periods.

Studies have been conducted in attempts to enhance the migratory ability of Schwann cells. Schwann cell migration is regulated by integrins with ECM molecules such as fibronectin and laminin. In addition, neural cell adhesion molecule (NCAM) is known to enhance Schwann cell motility in vitro. NCAM is a glycoprotein that is expressed on axonal and Schwann cell membranes. Polysialic acid (PSA) is synthesized on NCAM by polysialyltransferase (PST) and sialyltransferase X (STX). During the development of the CNS, PSA expression on NCAM is upregulated until postnatal stages. However, in the adult brain PSA is found only in regions with high plasticity. PSA expression does not occur on Schwann cells.

Lavdas et al. (2006) investigated whether sustained expression of PSA on Schwann cells enhances their migration. Schwann cells were tranduced with a retroviral vector encoding STX in order to induce PSA expression. PSA-expressing Schwann cells did obtain enhanced motility as demonstrated in a gap bridging assay and after grafting in postnatal forebrain slice cultures. PSA expression did not alter molecular and morphological differentiation. The PSA-expressing Schwann cells were able to myelinate CNS axons in cerebellar slices, which is not normally possible in vivo. It is hopeful that these PSA-expressing Schwann cells will be able to migrate throughout the CNS without loss of myelinating abilities and may become useful for regeneration and myelination of axons in the central nervous system.

==== Astrocytes ====
Astrocytes are glial cells that are abundant in the central nervous system. They are crucial for the metabolic and trophic support of neurons; additionally, astrocytes provide ion buffering and neurotransmitter clearance. Growing axons are guided by cues created by astrocytes; thus, astrocytes can regulate neurite pathfinding and subsequently, patterning in the developing brain. The glial scar that forms post-injury in the central nervous system is formed by astrocytes and fibroblasts; it is the most significant obstacle for regeneration. The glial scar consists of hypertrophied astrocytes, connective tissue, and ECM. Two goals of neural tissue engineering are to understand astrocyte function and to develop control over astrocytic growth. Studies by Shany et al. (2006) have demonstrated that astrocyte survival rates are increased on 3D aragonite matrices compared to conventional 2D cell cultures. The ability of cell processes to stretch out across curves and pores allows for the formation of multiple cell layers with complex 3D configurations.

The three distinct ways by which the cells acquired a 3D shape are:

1. adhering to surface and following the 3D contour
2. stretching some processes between 2 curvatures
3. extending processes in 3D within cell layers when located within multilayer tissue

In conventional cell culture, growth is restricted to one plane, causing monolayer formation with most cells contacting the surface; however, the 3D curvature of the aragonite surface allows multiple layers to develop and for astrocytes far apart to contact each other. It is important to promote process formation similar to 3D in vivo conditions, because astrocytic process morphology is essential in guiding directionality of regenerating axons. The aragonite topography provides a high surface area to volume ratio and lacks edges, which leads to a reduction of the culture edge effect. Crystalline matrices such as the aragonite mentioned here are allowed for the promotion of a complex 3D tissue formation that approaches in vivo conditions.

==== Olfactory ensheathing cells ====
The mammalian primary olfactory system has retained the ability to continuously regenerate during adulthood. Olfactory receptor neurons have an average lifespan of 6–8 weeks and therefore must be replaced by cells differentiated from the stem cells that are within a layer at the nearby epithelium's base. The new olfactory receptor neurons must project their axons through the CNS to an olfactory bulb in order to be functional. Axonal growth is guided by the glial composition and cytoarchitecture of the olfactory bulb in addition to the presence of olfactory ensheathing cells (OECs).

It is postulated that OECs originate in the olfactory placode, suggesting a different developmental origin than other similar nervous system microglia.

Another interesting concept is that OECs are found in both the peripheral and central nervous system portions of the primary olfactory system, that is, the olfactory epithelium and bulb.

OECs are similar to Schwann cells in that they provide an upregulation of low-affinity NGF receptor p75 following injury; however, unlike Schwann cells they produce lower levels of neurotrophins. Several studies have shown evidence of OECs being able to support regeneration of lesioned axons, but these results are often unable to be reproduced. Regardless, OECs have been investigated thoroughly in relation to spinal cord injuries, amyotrophic lateral sclerosis, and other neurodegenerative diseases. Researchers suggest that these cells possess a unique ability to remyelinate injured neurons.

OECs have properties similar to those of astrocytes, both of which have been identified as being susceptible to viral infection.

=== Stem cells ===
Stem cells are characterized by their ability to self-renew for a prolonged time and still maintain the ability to differentiate along one or more cell lineages. Stem cells may be unipotent, multipotent, or pluripotent, meaning they can differentiate into one, multiple, or all cell types, respectively. Pluripotent stem cells can become cells derived from any of the three embryonic germ layers. Stem cells have the advantage over glial cells because they are able to proliferate more easily in culture. However, it remains difficult to preferentially differentiate these cells into varied cell types in an ordered manner. Another difficulty with stem cells is the lack of a well-defined definition of stem cells beyond hematopoietic stem cells (HSCs). Each stem cell 'type' has more than one method for identifying, isolating, and expanding the cells; this has caused much confusion because all stem cells of a 'type' (neural, mesenchymal, retinal) do not necessarily behave in the same manner under identical conditions.

==== Adult stem cells ====
Adult stem cells are not able to proliferate and differentiate as effectively in vitro as they are able to in vivo. Adult stem cells can come from many different tissue locations, but it is difficult to isolate them because they are defined by behavior and not surface markers. A method has yet to be developed for clearly distinguishing between stem cells and the differentiated cells surrounding them. However, surface markers can still be used to a certain extent to remove most of the unwanted differentiated cells. Stem cell plasticity is the ability to differentiate across embryonic germ line boundaries. Though, the presence of plasticity has been hotly contested. Some claim that plasticity is caused by heterogeneity among the cells or cell fusion events. Currently, cells can be differentiated across cell lines with yields ranging from 10% to 90% depending on techniques used. More studies need to be done in order to standardize the yield with transdifferentiation. Transdifferentiation of multipotent stem cells is a potential means for obtaining stem cells that are not available or not easily obtained in the adult.

==== Mesenchymal stem cells ====
Mesenchymal stem cells are adult stem cells that are located in the bone marrow; they are able to differentiate into lineages of mesodermal origin. Some examples of tissue they form are bone, cartilage, fat, and tendon. MSCs are obtained by aspiration of bone marrow. Many factors promote the growth of MSCs including: platelet-derived growth factor, epidermal growth factor β, and insulin-like growth factor-1. In addition to their normal differentiation paths, MSCs can be transdifferentiated along nonmesenchymal lineages such as astrocytes, neurons, and PNS myelinating cells. MSCs are potentially useful for nerve regeneration strategies because:

1. their use is not an ethical concern
2. no immunosuppression is needed
3. they are an abundant and accessible resource
4. they tolerate genetic manipulations

Keilhoff et al. (2006) performed a study comparing the nerve regeneration capacity of non-differentiated and transdifferentiated MSCs to Schwann cells in devitalized muscle grafts bridging a 2-cm gap in the rat sciatic nerve. All cells were autologous. The transdifferentiated MSCs were cultured in a mixture of factors in order to promote Schwann cell-like cell formation. The undifferentiated MSCs demonstrated no regenerative capacity, while the transdifferentiated MSCs showed some regenerative capacity, though it did not reach the capacity of the Schwann cells.

==== Ectomesenchymal stem cells ====
The difficulty of isolating Schwann cells and subsequently inducing proliferation is a large obstacle. A solution is to selectively induce cells such as ectomesenchymal stem cells (EMSCs) into Schwann cell-like phenotypes. EMSCs are neural crest cells that migrate from the cranial neural crest into the first branchial arch during early development of the peripheral nervous system. EMSCs are multipotent and possess a self-renewing capacity. They can be thought of as Schwann progenitor cells because they are associated with dorsal root ganglion and motor nerve development. EMSC differentiation appears to be regulated by intrinsic genetic programs and extracellular signals in the surrounding environment. Schwann cells are the source for both neurotropic and neurotrophic factors essential for regenerating nerves and a scaffold for guiding growth. Nie, Zhang et al. conducted a study investigating the benefits of culturing EMSCs within PLGA conduits. Adding foskolin and BPE to an EMSC culture caused the formation of elongated cell processes, which is common to Schwann cells in vitro. Thus, foskolin and BPF may induce differentiation into Schwann cell-like phenotypes. BPE contains the cytokines GDNF, basic fibroblast growth factor and platelet-derived growth factor, which cause differentiation and proliferation of glial and Schwann cells by activating MAP kinases. When implanted into the PLGA conduits, the EMSCs maintained long-term survival and promoted peripheral nerve regeneration across a 10 mm gap, which usually demonstrates little to no regeneration. Myelinated axons were present within the grafts and basal laminae were formed within the myelin. These observations suggest that EMSCs may promote myelination of regenerated nerve fibers within the conduit.

==== Neural progenitor cells ====
Inserting neurons into a bioartificial nerve conduit seems like the most obvious method for replacing damaged nerves; however, neurons are unable to proliferate and they are often short-lived in culture. Thus, neural progenitor cells are more promising candidates for replacing damaged and degenerated neurons because they are self-renewing, which allows for the in vitro production of many cells with minimal donor material. In order to confirm that the new neurons formed from neural progenitor cells are a part of a functional network, the presence of synapse formation is required. A study by Ma, Fitzgerald et al. is the first demonstration of murine neural stem and progenitor cell-derived functional synapse and neuronal network formation on a 3D collagen matrix. The neural progenitor cells expanded and spontaneously differentiated into excitable neurons and formed synapses; furthermore, they retained the ability to differentiate into the three neural tissue lineages. It was also demonstrated that not only active synaptic vesicle recycling occurred, but also that excitatory and inhibitory connections capable of generating action potentials spontaneously were formed. Thus, neural progenitor cells are a viable and relatively unlimited source for creating functional neurons.

==== Neural stem cells ====
Neural stem cells (NSCs) have the capability to self-renew and to differentiate into neuronal and glial lineages. Many culture methods have been developed for directing NSC differentiation; however, the creation of biomaterials for directing NSC differentiation is seen as a more clinically relevant and usable technology. One approach to develop a biomaterial for directing NSC differentiation is to combine extracellular matrix (ECM) components and growth factors. A very recent study by Nakajima, Ishimuro et al. examined the effects of different molecular pairs consisting of a growth factor and an ECM component on the differentiation of NSCs into astrocytes and neuronal cells. The ECM components investigated were laminin-1 and fibronectin, which are natural ECM components, and ProNectin F plus (Pro-F) and ProNectin L (Pro-L), which are artificial ECM components, and poly(ethyleneimine) (PEI). The neurotrophic factors used were epidermal growth factor (EGF), fibroblast growth factor-2 (FGF-2), nerve growth factor (NGF), neurotrophin-3 (NT-3), and ciliary neurotrophic factor (CNTF). The pair combinations were immobilized onto matrix cell arrays, on which the NSCs were cultured. After 2 days in culture, the cells were stained with antibodies against nestin, β-tubulin III, and GFAP, which are markers for NSCs, neuronal cells, and astrocytes, respectively. The results provide valuable information on advantageous combinations of ECM components and growth factors as a practical method for developing a biomaterial for directing differentiation of NSCs.

== Neurotrophic factors ==
Currently, neurotrophic factors are being intensely studied for use in bioartificial nerve conduits because they are necessary in vivo for directing axon growth and regeneration. In studies, neurotrophic factors are normally used in conjunction with other techniques such as biological and physical cues created by the addition of cells and specific topographies. The neurotrophic factors may or may not be immobilized to the scaffold structure, though immobilization is preferred because it allows for the creation of permanent, controllable gradients. In some cases, such as neural drug delivery systems, they are loosely immobilized such that they can be selectively released at specified times and in specified amounts. Drug delivery is the next step beyond the basic addition of growth factors to nerve guidance conduits.

== Biomimetic materials ==
Many biomaterials used for nerve guidance conduits are biomimetic materials. Biomimetic materials are materials that have been design such that they elicit specified cellular responses mediated by interactions with scaffold-tethered peptides from ECM proteins; essentially, the incorporation of cell-binding peptides into biomaterials via chemical or physical modification.

== Synergism ==
Synergism often occurs when two elements are combined; it is an interaction between two elements that causes an effect greater than the combined effects of each element separately. Synergism is evident in the combining of scaffold material and topography with cellular therapies, neurotrophic factors, and biomimetic materials. Investigation of synergism is the next step after individual techniques have proven to be successful by themselves. The combinations of these different factors need to be carefully studied in order to optimize synergistic effects.

=== Optimizing neurotrophic factor combinations ===
It was hypothesized that interactions between neurotrophic factors could alter the optimal concentrations of each factor. While cell survival and phenotype maintenance are important, the emphasis of evaluation was on neurite extension. A combination of NGF, glial cell-line derived neurotrophic factor (GDNF), and ciliary neurotrophic factor (CNTF) was presented to Dorsal root ganglion cultures in vitro. One factor from each neurotrophic family was used. It was determined that there is not a difference in individual optimal concentration and combinatorial optimal concentration; however, around day 5 or 6 the neurites ceased extension and began to degrade. This was hypothesized to be due to lack of a critical nutrient or of proper gradients; previous studies have shown that growth factors are able to optimize neurite extension best when presented in gradients. Future studies on neurotrophic factor combinations will need to include gradients.

=== Combination of neural cell adhesion molecules and GFD-5 ===
Cell adhesion molecules (CAMs) and neurotrophic factors embedded together into biocompatible matrices is a relatively new concept being investigated. CAMs of the immunoglobulin superfamily (IgSF), which includes L1/NgCAM and neurofascin, are particularly promising, because they are expressed in the developing nervous system on neurons or Schwann cells. They are known to serve as guidance cues and mediate neuronal differentiation. Neurotrophic factors such as NGF and growth differentiation factor 5 (GDF-5), however, are well established as promoters of regeneration in vivo. A recent study by Niere, Brown et al. investigated the synergistic effects of combining L1 and neurofascin with NGF and GDF-5 on DRG neurons in culture; this combination enhanced neurite outgrowth. Further enhancement was demonstrated by combining L1 and neurofascin into an artificial fusion protein, which improves efficiency since factors are not delivered individually. Not only can different cues be used, but they may even be fused into a single 'new' cue.

=== Topography in synergy with chemical and biological cues ===
The effect of presenting multiple stimuli types such as chemical, physical, and biological cues on neural progenitor cell differentiation has not been explored. A study was conducted in which three different stimuli were presented to adult rat hippocampal progenitor cells (AHPCs): postnatal rat type-1 astrocytes (biological), laminin (chemical), and micropatterned substrate (physical). Over 75% of the AHPCs aligned within 20° of the grooves compared to random growth on the non-patterned substrates. When AHPCs were grown on micropatterned substrates with astrocytes, outgrowth was influenced by the astrocytes that had aligned with the grooves; namely, the AHPCs extended processes along the astrocytic cytoskeletal filaments. However, the alignment was not as significant as that seen by the AHPCs in culture alone with the micropatterned substrate. In order to assess the different phenotypes expressed as a result of differentiation, the cells were stained with antibodies for class III β-tubulin (TuJI), receptor interacting protein (RIP), and glial fibrillary acidic protein (GFAP), which are markers for early neurons, oligodendrocytes, and astrocytes, respectively. The greatest amount of differentiation was seen with AHPCs cultured on patterned substrates with astrocytes.
