= Neuroregeneration =

Renewal or physiological repair of damaged nerve tissue

Neuroregeneration is the regrowth or repair of nervous tissues, cells or cell products. Neuroregenerative mechanisms may include generation of new neurons, glia, axons, myelin, or synapses. Neuroregeneration differs between the peripheral nervous system (PNS) and the central nervous system (CNS) by the functional mechanisms involved, especially in the extent and speed of repair. When an axon is damaged, the distal segment undergoes Wallerian degeneration, losing its myelin sheath. The proximal segment can either die by apoptosis or undergo the chromatolytic reaction, which is an attempt at repair. In the CNS, synaptic stripping occurs as glial foot processes invade the dead synapse.

Nervous system injuries affect over 90,000 people every year. Spinal cord injuries alone affect an estimated 10,000 people each year. As a result of this high incidence of neurological injuries, nerve regeneration and repair, a subfield of neural tissue engineering, is becoming a rapidly growing field dedicated to the discovery of new ways to recover nerve functionality after injury.

The nervous system is divided by neurologists into two parts: the central nervous system (which consists of the brain and spinal cord) and the peripheral nervous system (which consists of cranial and spinal nerves along with their associated ganglia). While the peripheral nervous system has an intrinsic ability for repair and regeneration, the central nervous system is, for the most part, incapable of self-repair and regeneration. There is currently no treatment for recovering human nerve-function after injury to the central nervous system. Multiple attempts at nerve re-growth across the PNS-CNS transition have not been successful. There is simply not enough knowledge about regeneration in the central nervous system. In addition, although the peripheral nervous system has the capability for regeneration, much research still needs to be done to optimize the environment for maximum regrowth potential. Neuroregeneration is important clinically, as it is part of the pathogenesis of many diseases, including multiple sclerosis.

== Peripheral nervous system regeneration ==
Guillain–Barré syndrome – nerve damage

Neuroregeneration in the peripheral nervous system (PNS) occurs to a significant degree. After an injury to the axon, peripheral neurons activate a variety of signaling pathways which turn on pro-growth genes, leading to reformation of a functional growth cone and regeneration. The growth of these axons is also governed by chemotactic factors secreted from Schwann cells. Injury to the peripheral nervous system immediately elicits the migration of phagocytes, Schwann cells, and macrophages to the lesion site in order to clear away debris such as damaged tissue which is inhibitory to regeneration. When a nerve axon is severed, the end still attached to the cell body is labeled the proximal segment, while the other end is called the distal segment. After injury, the proximal end swells and experiences some retrograde degeneration, but once the debris is cleared, it begins to sprout axons and the presence of growth cones can be detected. The proximal axons are able to regrow as long as the cell body is intact, and they have made contact with the Schwann cells in the endoneurium (also known as the endoneurial tube or channel). Human axon growth rates can reach 2 mm/day in small nerves and 5 mm/day in large nerves. The distal segment, however, experiences Wallerian degeneration within hours of the injury; the axons and myelin degenerate, but the endoneurium remains. In the later stages of regeneration the remaining endoneurial tube directs axon growth back to the correct targets. During Wallerian degeneration, Schwann cells grow in ordered columns along the endoneurial tube, creating a band of Büngner cells that protects and preserves the endoneurial channel. Also, macrophages and Schwann cells release neurotrophic factors that enhance re-growth.

== Central nervous system regeneration ==
Unlike peripheral nervous system injury, injury to the central nervous system is not followed by extensive regeneration. It is limited by the inhibitory influences of the glial and extracellular environment. The hostile, non-permissive growth environment is, in part, created by the migration of myelin-associated inhibitors, astrocytes, oligodendrocytes, oligodendrocyte precursors, and microglia. The environment within the CNS, especially following trauma, counteracts the repair of myelin and neurons. Growth factors are not expressed or re-expressed; for instance, the extracellular matrix is lacking laminins. Glial scars rapidly form, and the glia actually produce factors that inhibit remyelination and axon repair; for instance, NOGO and NI-35. The axons themselves also lose the potential for growth with age, due to a decrease in GAP43 expression, among others.

Slower degeneration of the distal segment than that which occurs in the peripheral nervous system also contributes to the inhibitory environment because inhibitory myelin and axonal debris are not cleared away as quickly. All these factors contribute to the formation of what is known as a glial scar, which axons cannot grow across. The proximal segment attempts to regenerate after injury, but its growth is hindered by the environment. Central nervous system axons have been proven to regrow in permissive environments; therefore, the primary problem to central nervous system axonal regeneration is crossing or eliminating the inhibitory lesion site. Another problem is that the morphology and functional properties of central nervous system neurons are highly complex, for this reason a neuron functionally identical cannot be replaced by one of another type (Llinás' law).

== Research and clinical treatments ==
=== Neurons replacement ===
==== in vivo glias to neurons reprogramming ====
Transcription factors, activation of genes (using CRISPR activation) or small molecules are used to reprogram glias into neurons.

The most commonly targeted glias are astrocytes (usually using GFAP) because they share the same lineage as neurons and region—specific transcription signatures, while the vector used is typically an adeno-associated virus because some serotypes pass the blood brain barrier and it does not cause disease.

Targeted genes usually depend on the type of neuron sought; (NGN2 is known to produce glutamatergic, ASCL1: GABAergic...); RBPJ-k blocks the Notch pathway and elicits a neurogenic program and Sox2 can also increase reprogramming efficiency by causing a dedifferentiation and self-amplification phase before maturating as neurons.

While theses techniques show lot of promise in animal models for many otherwise incurable neurodegenerative diseases and brain injuries, no clinical trials have started as of 2023.

=== Tissue regrowth ===
==== Peripheral ====
===== Surgery =====
Surgery can be done in case a peripheral nerve has become cut or otherwise divided. This is called peripheral nerve reconstruction. The injured nerve is identified and exposed so that normal nerve tissue can be examined above and below the level of injury, usually with magnification, using either loupes or an operating microscope. If a large segment of nerve is harmed, as can happen in a crush or stretch injury, the nerve will need to be exposed over a larger area. Injured portions of the nerve are removed. The cut nerve endings are then carefully reapproximated using very small sutures. The nerve repair must be covered by healthy tissue, which can be as simple as closing the skin or it can require moving skin or muscle to provide healthy padded coverage over the nerve. The type of anesthesia used depends on the complexity of the injury. A surgical tourniquet is almost always used.

====== Prognosis ======
The expectations after surgical repair of a divided peripheral nerve depends on several factors:

- Age: Recovery of a nerve after surgical repair depends mainly on the age of the patient. Young children can recover close-to-normal nerve function. In contrast, a patient over 60 years old with a cut nerve in the hand would expect to recover only protective sensation; that is, the ability to distinguish hot/cold or sharp/dull.
- The mechanism of injury: Sharp injuries, such as a knife wound, damage only a very short segment of the nerve, availing for direct suture. In contrast, nerves that are divided by stretch or crush may be damaged over long segments. These nerve injuries are more difficult to treat and generally have a poorer outcome. In addition, associated injuries, like injury to bone, muscle and skin, can make nerve recovery more difficult.
- The level of injury: After a nerve is repaired, the regenerating nerve endings must grow all the way to their target. For example, a nerve injured at the wrist that normally provides sensation to the thumb must grow to the end of the thumb in order to provide sensation. The return of function decreases with increased distance over which a nerve must grow.

====== Autologous nerve grafting ======
Currently, autologous nerve grafting, or a nerve autograft, is known as the gold standard for clinical treatments used to repair large lesion gaps in the peripheral nervous system. It is important that nerves are not repaired under tension, which could otherwise happen if cut ends are reapproximated across a gap. Nerve segments are taken from another part of the body (the donor site) and inserted into the lesion to provide endoneurial tubes for axonal regeneration across the gap. However, this is not a perfect treatment; often the outcome is only limited function recovery. Also, partial de-innervation is frequently experienced at the donor site, and multiple surgeries are required to harvest the tissue and implant it.

When appropriate, a nearby donor may be used to supply innervation to lesioned nerves. Trauma to the donor can be minimized by utilizing a technique known as end-to-side repair. In this procedure, an epineurial window is created in the donor nerve and the proximal stump of the lesioned nerve is sutured over the window. Regenerating axons are redirected into the stump. Efficacy of this technique is partially dependent upon the degree of partial neurectomy performed on the donor, with increasing degrees of neurectomy giving rise to increasing axon regeneration within the lesioned nerve, but with the consequence of increasing deficit to the donor.

Some evidence suggests that local delivery of soluble neurotrophic factors at the site of autologous nerve grafting may enhance axon regeneration within the graft and help expedite functional recovery of a paralyzed target. Other evidence suggests that gene-therapy induced expression of neurotrophic factors within the target muscle itself can also help enhance axon regeneration. Accelerating neuroregeneration and the reinnervation of a denervated target is critically important in order to reduce the possibility of permanent paralysis due to muscular atrophy.

====== Allografts and xenografts ======
Variations on the nerve autograft include the allograft and the xenograft. In allografts, the tissue for the graft is taken from another person, the donor, and implanted in the recipient. Xenografts involve taking donor tissue from another species. Allografts and xenografts have the same disadvantages as autografts, but in addition, tissue rejection from immune responses must also be taken into account. Often immunosuppression is required with these grafts. Disease transmission also becomes a factor when introducing tissue from another person or animal. Overall, allografts and xenografts do not match the quality of outcomes seen with autografts, but they are necessary when there is a lack of autologous nerve tissue.

===== Nerve guidance conduit =====
Because of the limited functionality received from autografts, the current gold standard for nerve regeneration and repair, recent neural tissue engineering research has focused on the development of bioartificial nerve guidance conduits in order to guide axonal regrowth. The creation of artificial nerve conduits is also known as entubulation because the nerve ends and intervening gap are enclosed within a tube composed of biological or synthetic materials.

===== Immunisation =====
A direction of research is towards the use of drugs that target remyelinating inhibitor proteins, or other inhibitors. Possible strategies include vaccination against these proteins (active immunisation), or treatment with previously created antibodies (passive immunisation). These strategies appear promising on animal models with experimental autoimmune encephalomyelitis (EAE), a model of MS. Monoclonal antibodies have also been used against inhibitory factors such as NI-35 and NOGO.

== Hindrance: Inhibition of axonal regrowth after damage ==
Glial cell scar formation is induced following damage to the nervous system. In the central nervous system, this glial scar formation significantly inhibits nerve regeneration, which leads to a loss of function. Several families of molecules are released that promote and drive glial scar formation. For instance, transforming growth factors B-1 and -2, interleukins, and cytokines play a role in the initiation of scar formation. The accumulation of reactive astrocytes at the site of injury and the up regulation of molecules that are inhibitory for neurite outgrowth contribute to the failure of neuroregeneration. The up-regulated molecules alter the composition of the extracellular matrix in a way that has been shown to inhibit neurite outgrowth extension. This scar formation involves several cell types and families of molecules.

=== Chondroitin sulfate proteoglycan ===
In response to scar-inducing factors, astrocytes up regulate the production of chondroitin sulfate proteoglycans. Astrocytes are a predominant type of glial cell in the central nervous system that provide many functions including damage mitigation, repair, and glial scar formation. The RhoA pathway is involved. Chondroitin sulfate proteoglycans (CSPGs) have been shown to be up regulated in the central nervous system (CNS) following injury. Repeating disaccharides of glucuronic acid and galactosamine, glycosaminoglycans (CS-GAGs), are covalently coupled to the protein core CSPGs. CSPGs have been shown to inhibit regeneration in vitro and in vivo, but the role that the CSPG core protein vs. CS-GAGs had not been studied until recently.

=== Keratan sulfate proteoglycans ===
Like the chondroitin sulfate proteoglycans, keratan sulfate proteoglycan (KSPG) production is up regulated in reactive astrocytes as part of glial scar formation. KSPGs have also been shown to inhibit neurite outgrowth extension, limiting nerve regeneration. Keratan sulfate, also called keratosulfate, is formed from repeating disaccharide galactose units and N-acetylglucosamines. It is also 6-sulfated. This sulfation is crucial to the elongation of the keratan sulfate chain. A study was done using N-acetylglucosamine 6-O-sulfotransferase-1 deficient mice. The wild type mouse showed a significant up regulation of mRNA expressing N-acetylglucosamine 6-O-sulfotransferase-1 at the site of cortical injury. However, in the N-acetylglucosamine 6-O-sulfotransferase-1 deficient mice, the expression of keratan sulfate was significantly decreased when compared to the wild type mice. Similarly, glial scar formation was significantly reduced in the N-acetylglucosamine 6-O-sulfotransferase-1 mice, and as a result, nerve regeneration was less inhibited.

=== Other inhibitory factors ===
Proteins of oligodendritic or glial debris origin that influence neuroregeneration:

- NOGO –The protein family Nogo, particularly Nogo-A, has been identified as an inhibitor of remyelination in the CNS, especially in autoimmune mediated demyelination, such as found in experimental autoimmune encephalomyelitis (EAE), and multiple sclerosis (MS). Nogo A functions via either its amino-Nogo terminus through an unknown receptor, or by its Nogo-66 terminus through NgR1, p75, TROY or LINGO1. Antagonising this inhibitor results in improved remyelination, as it is involved in the RhoA pathway.
- NI-35 a non-permissive growth factor from myelin.
- MAG – Myelin-associated glycoprotein acts via the receptors NgR2, GT1b, NgR1, p75, TROY and LINGO1.
- OMgp – Oligodendrocyte myelin glycoprotein
- Ephrin B3 functions through the EphA4 receptor and inhibits remyelination.
- Sema 4D (Semaphorin 4D) functions through the PlexinB1 receptor and inhibits remyelination.
- Sema 3A (Semaphorin 3A) is present in the scar that forms in both central nervous system and peripheral nerve injuries and contributes to the outgrowth-inhibitory properties of these scars.

== See also ==
- PTEN
- Muscle LIM protein
- Microtubule detyrosination
- Myelinogenesis
- Magnetic field
- Magnetic nanoparticles
- Neuroprotection
- Regenerative medicine
- SPIONs
- Spinal cord injury research
