= Nanotopography =

Surface features at the nanoscopic scale

Nanotopography refers to specific surface features which form or are generated at the nanoscopic scale. While the term can be used to describe a broad range of applications ranging from integrated circuits to microfluidics, in practice it typically applied to sub-micron textured surfaces as used in biomaterials research.

== In nature ==
Several functional nanotopographies have been identified in nature. Certain surfaces like that of the lotus leaf have been understood to apply nanoscale textures for abiotic processes such as self-cleaning. Bio-mimetic applications of this discovery have since arrived in consumer products. In 2012, it was recognized that nanotopographies in nature are also used for antibiotic purposes. The wing of the cicada, the surface of which is covered in nanoscale pillars, induces lysis of bacteria. While the nano-pillars were not observed to prevent cell adhesion, they acted mechanistically to stretch microbial membranes to breakage. In vitro testing of the cicada wing demonstrated its efficacy against a variety of bacterial strains.

== Manufacturing ==
Numerous technologies are available for the production of nanotopography. High-throughput techniques include plasma functionalization, abrasive blasting, and etching. Though low cost, these processes are limited in the control and replicability of feature size and geometry. Techniques enabling greater feature precision exist, among them electron beam lithography and particle deposition, but are slower and more resource intensive by comparison. Alternatively, processes such as molecular self-assembly can be utilized which provide an enhanced level of production speed and feature control.

=== Electrochemical Anodization ===
Diagram of electrochemical anodization using Ti submerged in a fluoride-containing electrolyte solution.

Electrochemical anodization is a surface modification technique used to create nanoscale oxide structures on metals. This process is relatively inexpensive and allows for control of nanotopography through changes in electrochemical conditions. In 1999, V. Zwilling and his colleagues were the first to create nanotube TiO_{2} layers through electrochemical anodization in fluoride solutions. This work laid the foundation for subsequent research concerning TiO_{2} nanotubules, which has expanded since its initial discovery.

Self-organizing nanotube formation involves two competing processes: electrochemical oxide growth and oxide dissolution. When a DC voltage is applied across the anode and cathode, titanium is oxidized at the anode, and a TiO_{2} layer begins to form. The fluoride electrolyte solution will then selectively remove the TiO_{2} layer at the same time by dissolution. These two competing reactions lead to the formation of self-organized TiO_{2} nanotubules. Under proper electrochemical conditions, the greater the voltage applied across the anode and cathode, the greater the diameter of the nanotubules. Nanotube formation is also highly influenced by electrolyte pH, temperature, electrolyte composition, fluoride concentration, and anodization duration. The process by which the nanotubes and pores are formed remains debated.

Formation of Oxide layer: $\ce{Ti +2H_2O-> TiO_2 +4H^+ +4e^-}$

Formation of nanotubules/nanopores by dissolution: $\ce{TiO_2 +6F^- +4H^+-> [TiF_6]^2- + 2H_2O}$

Titanium and its alloys are widely used as a biomaterial due to their high resistance to corrosion, its high free surface energy, mechanical properties, and ability to change its topography through a variety of methods. A major benefit to TiO2 nanotopography formation through electrochemical anodization is that the surface topography mimics that of bone, lending to improved osseointegration.

== Applications to medicine ==
Though the effects of nanotopography on cell behavior have only been recognized since 1964, some of the first practical applications of the technology are being realized in the field of medicine. Among the few clinical applications is the functionalization of titanium implant surfaces with nanotopography, generated with submersion etching and sand blasting. This technology has been the focal point of a diverse body of research aimed at improving post-operative integration of certain implant components. The determinant of integration varies, but as most titanium implants are orthopedics-oriented, osseointegration is the dominant aim of the field.

=== Dental Implants ===
Conventional titanium dental implants are bioinert, as their surfaces generally do not to create direct chemical bonds with surrounding tissue. Because of this, various surface modification techniques, such as nano-coatings, have been developed to improve osseointegration of dental implants.

Studies have shown that nanotopography can increase osteoblast differentiation, bone apposition and, in some cases, antimicrobial properties. Surface topographies can also influence the adsorption of proteins, such as fibronectin, fibrinogen, and albumin. Adhesive proteins can later bind to integrin receptors, promoting cell adhesion and signaling. This whole process has the potential to contribute to osseointegration if the environment is favorable.

== Applications to cell engineering ==
Nanotopography is readily applied to cell culture and has been shown to have a significant impact on cell behavior across different lineages. Substrate features in the nanoscale regime down to the order of 9 nm are able to retain some effect. Subjected solely to topographical cues, a wide variety of cells demonstrate responses including changes in cell growth and gene expression. Certain patterns are able to induce stem cells to differentiate down specific pathways. Notable results include osteogenic induction in the absence of media components as well as near-total cell alignment as seen in smooth muscle. The potential of topographical cues to fulfill roles otherwise requiring xeno-based media components offers high translatability to clinical applications, as regulation and cost related to animal-derived products constitutes a major roadblock in a number of cell-related technologies.
