= Glial scar =

Mass formed in response to injury to the nervous system

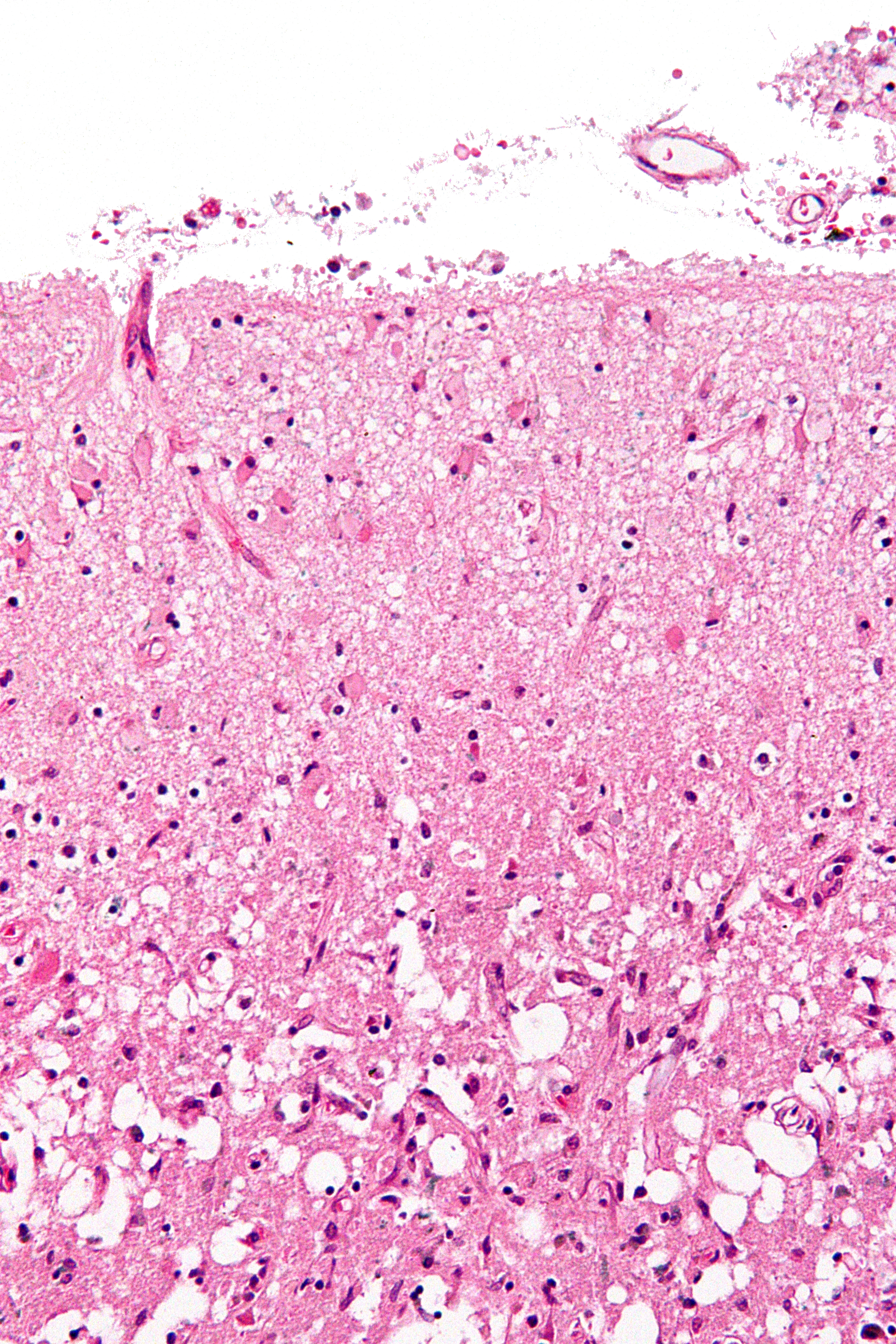
- Micrograph of the superficial cerebral cortex showing neuron loss and reactive astrocytes in a person who had a stroke. H&E-LFB stain.
- Specialty: Pathology
- Causes: Trauma

A glial scar formation (gliosis) is a reactive cellular process involving astrogliosis that occurs after injury to the central nervous system. As with scarring in other organs and tissues, the glial scar is the body's mechanism to protect and begin the healing process in the nervous system.

In the context of neurodegeneration, formation of the glial scar has been shown to have both beneficial and detrimental effects. Particularly, many neuro-developmental inhibitor molecules are secreted by the cells within the scar that prevent complete physical and functional recovery of the central nervous system after injury or disease. On the other hand, absence of the glial scar has been associated with impairments in the repair of the blood brain barrier.

== Scar components ==
The glial scar is composed of several components briefly discussed below.

=== Reactive astrocytes ===
Reactive astrocytes are the main cellular component of the glial scar. After injury, astrocytes undergo morphological changes, extend their processes, and increase synthesis of glial fibrillary acidic protein (GFAP). GFAP is an important intermediate filament protein that allows the astrocytes to begin synthesizing more cytoskeletal supportive structures and extend pseudopodia. Ultimately, the astrocytes form a dense web of their plasma membrane extensions that fills the empty space generated by the dead or dying neuronal cells (a process called astrogliosis). The heavy proliferation of astrocytes also modifies the extracellular matrix surrounding the damaged region by secreting many molecules including laminin, fibronectin, tenascin C, and proteoglycans. These molecules are important modulators of neuronal outgrowth. Accordingly, their presence after injury contributes to inhibition of regeneration.

Another important caveat of the astrocytic response to CNS injuries is its heterogeneity. Particularly, the response of the astrocytes to the injury varies depending on factors such as the nature of the injury and the microenvironment at the injury location. Further, the reactive astrocytes in the immediate vicinity of the injury increase gene expression, thus compounding the response of other astrocytes and contributing to the heterogeneity. Particularly, astrocytes closest to the lesion generally secrete more inhibitory molecules into the extracellular matrix.

=== Microglia ===
Microglia are the second most prominent cell type present within the glial scar. They are the nervous system analog of immune system macrophages. Microglia rapidly activate near the injury and secrete several cytokines, bioactive lipids, coagulation factors, reactive oxygen intermediates, and neurotrophic factors. The expression of these molecules depends on the location of the microglial cells relative to the injury, with the cells closest to the injury secreting the largest amount of such biologically active molecules.

=== Endothelial cells and fibroblasts ===
The various biologically active molecules secreted by microglia stimulate and recruit endothelial cells and fibroblasts. These cells help stimulate angiogenesis and collagen secretion into the injured area. Ultimately, the amount of capillaries extended into the injured area is twice that of uninjured central nervous system regions.

=== Basal membrane ===
The basal membrane is a histopathological extracellular matrix feature that forms at the center of injury and partially covers the astrocytic processes. It is composed of three layers with the basal lamina as the prominent layer. Molecularly, the basal membrane is created by glycoprotein and proteoglycan protomers. Further, two independent networks are formed within the basal membrane by collagen IV and laminin for structural support. Other molecular components of the basal membrane include fibulin-1, fibronectin, entactin, and heparin sulfate proteoglycan perlecan. Ultimately, the astrocytes attach to the basal membrane, and the complex surrounds the blood vessels and nervous tissue to form the initial wound covering.

== Beneficial effects of the scar ==
The ultimate function of the glial scar is to reestablish the physical and chemical integrity of the CNS. This is done by generating a barrier across the injured area that seals the nervous/non-nervous tissue boundary. This also allows for the regeneration of the selective barrier to prevent further microbial infections and spread of cellular damage. Moreover, the glial scar stimulates revascularization of blood capillaries to increase the nutritional, trophic, and metabolic support of the nervous tissue.

== Detrimental effects of the scar ==
The glial scar also prevents neuronal regrowth. Following trauma to the CNS, axons begin to sprout and attempt to extend across the injury site in order to repair the damaged regions. However, the scar prevents axonal extensions via physical and chemical means. Astrocytes form a dense network of gap junctions that generates a physical barrier to axonal regrowth. Further, the astrocytes secrete several growth-inhibitory molecules that chemically prevent axonal extensions. Moreover, the basal membrane component is expected to generate an additional physical and chemical barrier to axonal extensions.

== Primary scar molecular inducers ==
The formation of the glial scar is a complex process. Several main classes of molecular mediators of gliosis have been identified and are briefly discussed below.

=== Transforming growth factor β ===
Two neuronally-important subclasses of transforming growth factor family of molecules are TGFβ-1 and TGFβ-2 that directly stimulate astrocytes, endothelial cells, and macrophages. TGFβ-1 has been observed to increase immediately after injury to the central nervous system, whereas TGFβ-2 expression occurs more slowly near the injury site. Further, TGFβ-2 has been shown to stimulate growth-inhibitory proteoglycans by astrocytes. Experimental reduction of TGFβ-1 and TGFβ-2 has been shown to partially reduce glial scarring.

=== Interleukins ===
Interleukins are another potential family of scar-inducing cellular messengers. Particularly, interleukin-1, a protein produced by mononuclear phagocytes, helps to initiate the inflammatory response in astrocytes, leading to reactive astrogliosis and the formation of the glial scar.

=== Cytokines ===
The cytokine family of glial scar inducers include interferon-γ (IFNγ) and fibroblast growth factor 2 (FGF2). IFNγ has been shown to induce astrocyte proliferation and increase the extent of glial scarring in injured brain models. Further, FGF2 production increases after injury to the brain and spinal cord. FGF2 has also been shown to increase astrocyte proliferation in vitro.

=== Ciliary neurotrophic factor ===
Ciliary neurotrophic factor (CNTF) is a cytosolic protein that is not secreted. CNTF has been shown to promote the survival of neuronal cultures in vitro, and it can also act as a differentiator and trophic factor on glial cells. Further, CNTF has been previously shown to affect the differentiation of glial precursor cells in vitro; however, the influence of CNTF in the in vivo setting has only recently been determined. Winter et al. used CNTF over-expressing transgenic mice as well as wildtype controls that had CNTF levels artificially elevated via injection, were subjected to neuronal damage using ZnSO_{4} (a known neuronal degenerative factor), which was injected intranasally in the olfactory epithelium. The olfactory bulb was then assessed for the expression of GFAP mRNA- a common marker for the glial scar. It was determined that mice with elevated levels of CNTF increased their GFAP mRNA expression two-fold. This data suggests that CNTF may mediate glial scar formation following CNS damage.

=== Upregulation of nestin intermediate filament protein ===
Nestin is an intermediate filament (IF) protein that assists with IF polymerization and macromolecule stability. Intermediate filaments are an integral part of cell motility, a requirement for any large migration or cellular reaction. Nestin is normally present during (CNS) development and reactivates after minor stresses to the nervous system. However, Frisen et al. determined that nestin is also upregulated during severe stresses such as lesions which involve the formation of the glial scar. Mid-thoracic spinal cord lesions, optic nerve lesions, but not lesions to the sciatic nerve, have shown marked increases in nestin expression within the first 48 hours after trauma. Further, nestin upregulation was shown to last for up to 13 months post-injury. This data suggests that nestin upregulation may be associated with CNS glial scarring.

== Suppression of glial scar formation ==
Several techniques have been devised to impede scar formation. Such techniques can be combined with other neuroregeneration techniques to help with functional recovery.

=== Olomoucine ===
Olomoucine, a purine derivative, is a cyclin-dependent kinase (CDK) inhibitor. CDK is a cell-cycle promoting protein, which along with other pro-growth proteins is abnormally activated during glial scar formation. Such proteins can increase astrocyte proliferation and can also lead to cell death, thus exacerbating cellular damage at the lesion site. Administration of olomoucine peritoneally has been shown to suppress CDK function. Further, olomoucine has been shown to reduce neuronal cell death, reduce astroglial proliferation (and therefore reduce astrogliosis), and increase GAP-43 expression, a useful protein marker for neurite growth. Moreover, reduced astrocyte proliferation decreases expression of chondroitin sulfate proteoglycans (CSPGs), major extracellular matrix molecules associated with inhibition of neuroregneration after trauma to the CNS.

Recent work has also shown that olomoucine suppresses microglial proliferation within the glial scar. This is particularly important because microglia play an important role in the secondary damage following lesion to the CNS, during the time of scar formation. Microglial cells are activated via various pro-inflammatory cytokines (some discussed above). Rat spinal cord injury models have shown remarkable improvements after the administration of olomoucine. One hour-post administration, olomoucine suppressed microglial proliferation, as well as reduced the tissue edema normally present during the early stages of glial scar formation. Further, 24 hours post-administration, a reduction in concentration of interleukin-1β was observed. Additionally, the administration of olomoucine has also been shown to decrease neuronal cell death.

=== Inhibition of phosphodiesterase 4 (PDE4) ===
Phosphodiesterase 4 is a member of the phosphodiesterase family of proteins that cleave phosphodiester bonds. This is an important step in degrading cyclic adenosine monophosphate (cAMP), a major intracellular signaling molecule; conversely, blocking PDE4 will increase cAMP. Increased intracellular cAMP levels in neurons has been previously shown to induce axonal growth. In 2004, Nikulina et al. showed that administration of rolipram, a PDE4 inhibitor, can increase cAMP levels in neurons after spinal cord injury. This is partially possible because rolipram is sufficiently small to pass through the blood–brain barrier and immediately begin to catalyze reactions in neurons. 10 day administration of rolipram in spinal cord injured rodents resulted in considerable axonal growth associated with a reduction in glial scarring at 2 weeks post-injury. The mechanism for this reduction in glial scarring is currently unknown, but possible mechanisms include axonal extensions that physically prevent reactive astrocytes from proliferating, as well as chemical signaling events to reduce reactive astrogliosis.

=== Ribavirin ===
Ribavirin is a purine nucleoside analogue that is generally used as an anti-viral medication. However, it has also been shown to decrease the amount of reactive astrocytes. Daily administration for at least five days following brain trauma was shown to significantly decrease the number of reactive astrocytes.

=== Antisense GFAP retrovirus ===
An antisense GFAP retrovirus (PLBskG) to reduce GFAP mRNA expression, has been implemented in suppressing growth and arresting astrocytes in the G1 phase of the cell cycle. However, a main caveat to the clinical application of retroviral use is the non-discriminatory effects of PLBskG on normal as well as injured astrocytes. Further in vivo studies are needed to determine the systemic effects of PLBskG administration.

=== Recombinant monoclonal antibody to transforming growth factor-β2 ===
As noted in the above section, transforming growth factor-β2 (TGFβ2) is an important glial scar stimulant that directly affects astrocyte proliferation. Logan et al. developed monoclonal antibodies to TGFβ2, cerebral wounds were generated in rat brains, and the antibodies were administered via the ventricles, daily for 10 days. Subsequent analysis showed a marked reduction in glial scarring. Particularly, extracellular matrix protein deposition (laminin, fibronectin, and chondroitin sulfate proteoglycans) was closer to baseline (levels of protein expression in an uninjured animal). Further, a reduction in astrocytes and microglia, as well as a reduction in inflammation and angiogenesis, were observed.

=== Recombinant monoclonal antibody to interleukin-6 receptor ===
Interleukin-6 (IL-6) is thought to be a molecular mediator of glial scar formation. It has been shown to promote differentiation of neural stem cells into astrocytes. A monoclonal antibody, MR16-1, has been used to target and block the IL-6 receptors in rat spinal cord injury models. In a study by Okada et al., mice were intraperitoneally injected with a single dose of MR16-1 immediately after generating a spinal cord injury. Blockade of IL-6 receptors decreased the number of astrocytes present at the spinal cord lesion and this decrease was associated with a reduction in glial scarring.

== Glial scar treatment or removal ==
Chondroitinase ABC has been shown to degrade glial scars. Degrading the glial scar with chondroitinase has been shown to promote recovery from spinal cord injury, especially when combined with other techniques such as nerve guidance conduits, schwann cell transplants, and peripheral nerve autografts.

== See also ==
- Fibrosis
- Lesional demyelinations of the central nervous system
- Pathology of multiple sclerosis
