= Solvent casting and particulate leaching =

In solvent casting and particulate leaching (SCPL), a polymer is dissolved in an organic solvent. Particles, mainly salts, with specific dimensions are then added to the solution. The mixture is shaped into its final geometry. For example, it can be cast onto a glass plate to produce a membrane or in a three-dimensional mold to produce a scaffold. When the solvent evaporates, it creates a structure of composite material consisting of the particles together with the polymer. The composite material is then placed in a bath which dissolves the particles, leaving behind a porous structure.
