= Gia Voeltz =

American cell biologist

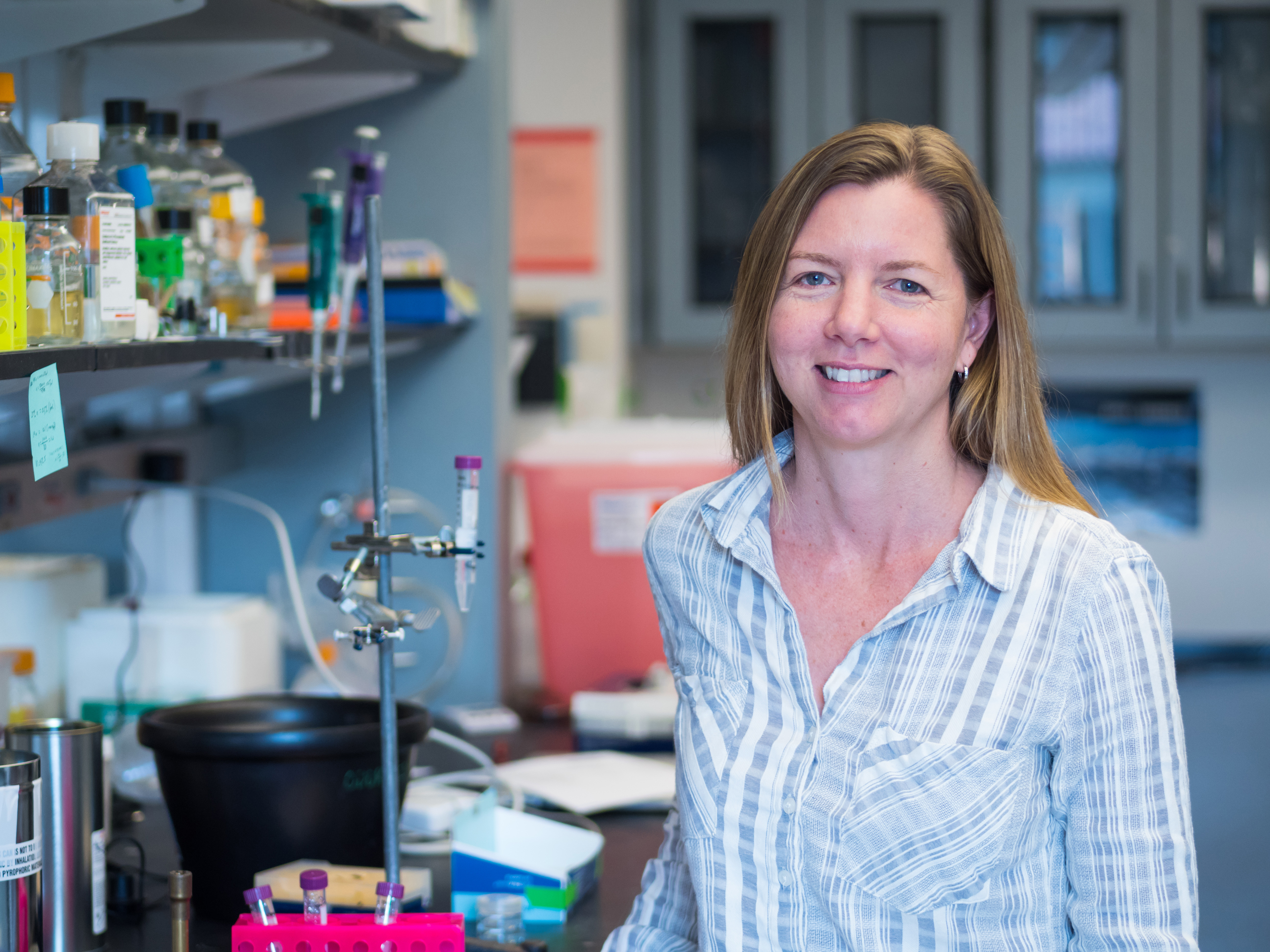
- Born: Gia Voeltz; Bloomington, Indiana, United States
- Education: University of California Santa Cruz (BS); Yale University (PhD); Harvard Medical School (Postdoctoral)
- Known for: discovering the function of the Reticulon protein family
- Awards: Member: National Academy of Sciences 2023; Fellow: American Society for Cell Biology 2023; Investigator: Howard Hughes Medical Institute 2018Scholar: Howard Hughes Medical Institute 2016
- Scientific career
- Fields: Cell biology; Molecular biology
- Workplaces: Howard Hughes Medical Institute; University of Colorado Boulder
- Thesis: mRNA Stability is Regulated during Early Development by AU-rich Sequences and a Novel Poly(A) Binding Protein, ePAB (2001)
- Doctoral advisor: Joan A. Steitz

Gia Kaarina Voeltz is an American cell biologist. She is a professor of Molecular, Cellular and Developmental Biology at the University of Colorado Boulder and a Howard Hughes Medical Institute Investigator. She is known for her research identifying the factors and unraveling the mechanisms that determine the structure and dynamics of the largest organelle in the cell: the endoplasmic reticulum. Her lab has produced paradigm shifting studies on organelle membrane contact sites that have revealed that most cytoplasmic organelles are not isolated entities but are instead physically tethered to an interconnected ER membrane network.

Her research has revealed the fundamental nature of these ER contact sites in regulating the biogenesis of other organelles at positions where they are tethered and closely opposed.

== Early life and education ==
Gia Voeltz grew up in several different states including Indiana, Hawaii, Minnesota and Upstate New York, where she graduated from Chenango Forks High School. She attended university at the University of California Santa Cruz where she majored in Biochemistry and Molecular Biology. She performed her senior thesis work in the lab of Manny Ares on pre-spliceosome assembly in yeast. This experience in the Ares lab at UC Santa Cruz inspired her to become a scientist. Her early undergraduate research studying RNA processing led her to pursue a PhD thesis in the Department of Molecular Biophysics and Biochemistry at Yale University in the lab of Joan A. Steitz, a leading figure in RNA biology. Her PhD research investigated how mRNA stability was regulated during different stages of early development using Xenopus eggs and extract as a model system.

She then moved to Harvard Medical School to join the lab of Tom Rapoport as a Jane Coffin Childs postdoctoral fellow.

== Career ==
Gia Voeltz was trained as an RNA biologist but made a major switch in scientific sub-fields when she moved to Tom Rapoport’s lab as a postdoc to study how organelles get their shape. As a postdoc, she set out to identify how membrane proteins generate the elaborate shape of the ER. To do this, she used biochemical fractionation of a Xenopus egg in vitro assay for ER network formation. Her postdoctoral studies identified the Reticulon family of ER membrane proteins and demonstrated their conserved role in generating the structure of the tubular ER network. The hairpin "wedge" mechanism proposed was that Reticulon has two short hairpin transmembrane domains that occupy more area in the outer leaflet to generate the high membrane curvature found in tubules.

Gia Voeltz moved to University of Colorado Boulder in 2006 to start her own lab. Her lab leveraged spinning disk confocal microscopy to visualize the reticulon-generated dynamic tubular ER network in live cells at high resolution. This led to the observation that ER tubule dynamics often occurred at positions where the ER tubules were tightly tethered to other dynamic organelles like endosomes and mitochondria.

Multi-color live cell fluorescence imaging complemented by high resolution electron microscopy and tomography revealed that the vast majority of endosomes and mitochondria are tethered to the ER at contact sites. In a hallmark paper published in 2011, Voeltz lab, in a collaboration with Jodi Nunnari’s lab, showed that ER tubules wrap around mitochondria to define the position where mitochondria constrict and divide in animal and yeast cells.

Her lab has gone on to show that ER contact sites also regulate early and late endosome fission, RNA granule division, and mitochondrial fusion. These works establish the ER network as a master regulator of organelle biogenesis through ER contact sites.

Gia Voeltz became a Howard Hughes Medical Institute Scholar in 2016 and a Howard Hughes Medical Institute Investigator in 2018. She was elected to the National Academy of Sciences in 2023.

== Awards and honors ==
- Elected a Member of the National Academy of Sciences (2023)
- Elected a Fellow of the American Society of Cell Biology (2023)
- Appointed an Investigator of the Howard Hughes Medical Institute (2018)
- Howard Hughes Medical Institute Scholar Award (2016)
- Porter Lecture Award from the American Society of Cell Biology (2015)
- American Cancer Society Research Scholar Award (2013)
- Provost's Faculty Achievement Award, University of Colorado Boulder (2012)
- Günter Blobel Early Career Award (2012)
- Searle Scholars Early Career Award (2007)
- Jane Coffin Childs Postdoctoral Fellowship Award (2001)
- Graduated with High Honors, University of California Santa Cruz (1994)

== Institutions ==
- University of Colorado Boulder 2006–present
- Howard Hughes Medical Institute 2018–present
- PhD Advisor: Joan A. Steitz, Yale University, 1995–2001
- Postdoc Advisor: Tom Rapoport, Harvard Medical School 2001–2006
