= Evan Reid =

Scottish neurogeneticist and academic

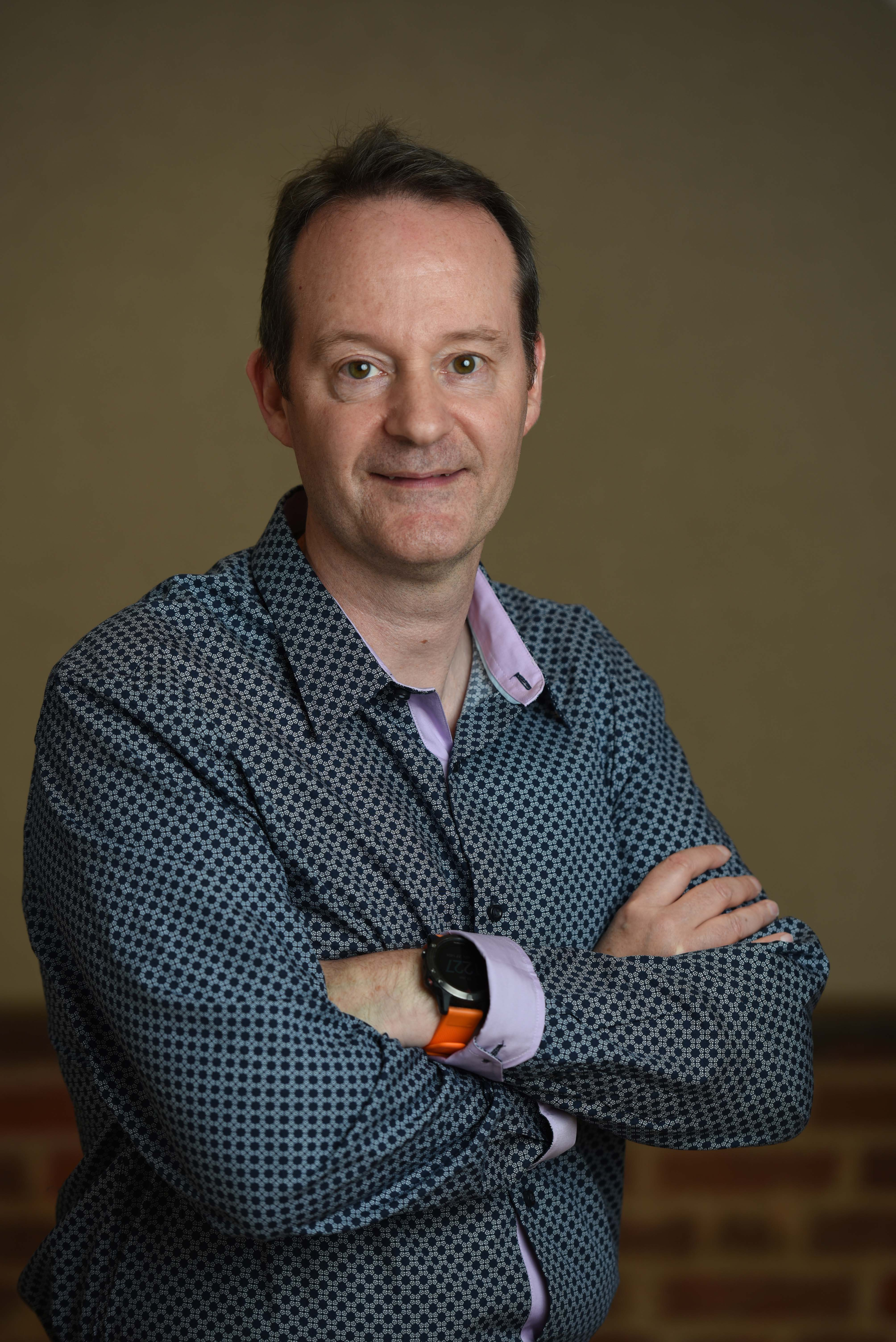
Professor Evan Reid

Evan Reid is a Scottish neurogenetics researcher and clinical academic. He is Professor of Neurogenetics and Molecular Neurobiology at the University of Cambridge and a principal investigator at the Cambridge Institute for Medical Research. His research focuses on the clinical features, genetics, and molecular cell biology of hereditary spastic paraplegias (HSPs).

== Career & research ==
Reid's lab has identified mulitiple genetic loci and causitive genes for neurological conditions. In 2012, his research identified abnormalities in the Reticulon 2 gene as a cause of hereditary spastic paraplegia. He also reported several other causative genes, including KIF5A (responsible for HSP type 10). This work has been highlighted by patient advocacy groups as a key advancement in understanding the condition.

His work has specifically examined the cellular functions of spastin, the protein most frequently mutated in HSP. This research has elucidated spastin's role in cell division and endosomal trafficking, providing insights into the mechanisms of axonal degeneration.

Reid and colleagues also reported that mutations in the VPS4A gene cause a previously undescribed neurodevelopmental condition, which they termed CIMDAG.

== Professional recognition ==
Reid is a Fellow of the Royal College of Physicians and Surgeons of Glasgow (2004). He was elected a Fellow of St Edmund's College, Cambridge, in 2010, and appointed Lecturer at the University of Cambridge in 2014. He has held both an Advanced Research Fellowship (2004) and a Senior Research Fellowship (2008) from the Wellcome Trust.

Reid serves on the medical board of The Maddi Foundation, an independent charity supporting research into rare neurodegenerative diseases.
