= LINGO1 =

Protein-coding gene in the species Homo sapiens

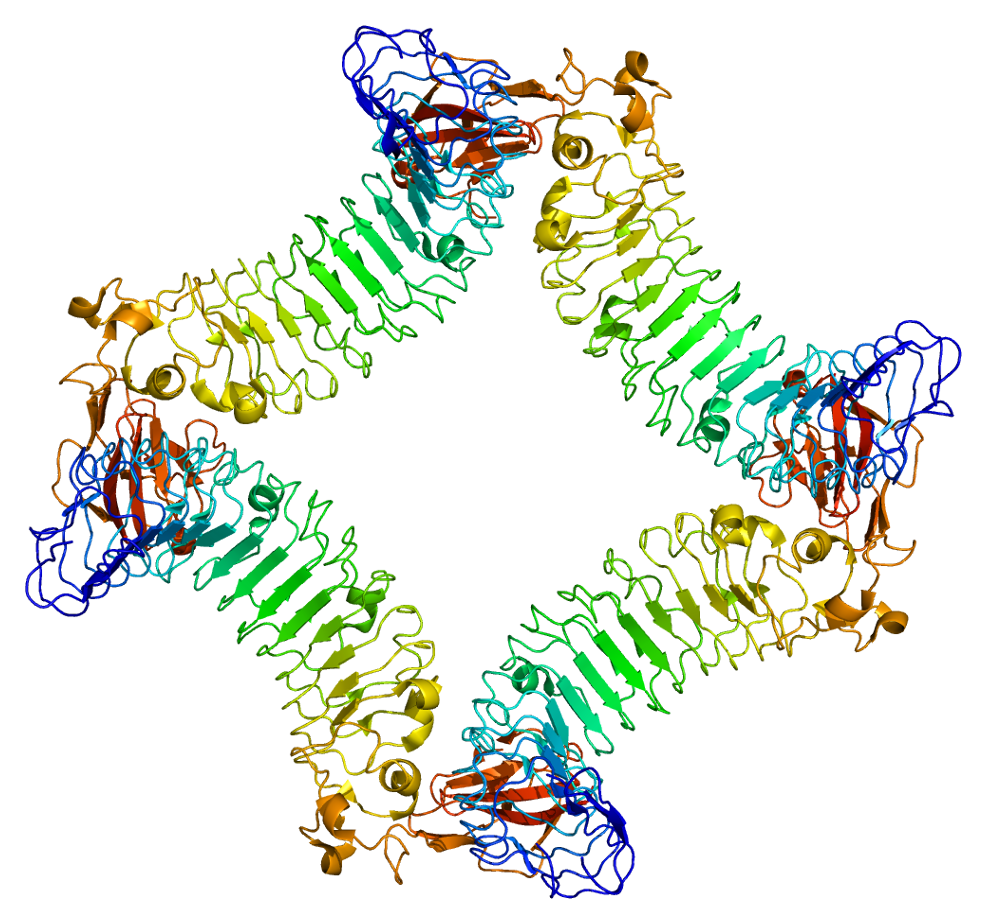

Identifiers
- Aliases: LINGO1, LERN1, LRRN6A, UNQ201, leucine rich repeat and Ig domain containing 1, MRT64
- External IDs: OMIM: 609791; MGI: 1915522; GeneCards: LINGO1
Available structures
PDB	Ortholog search: PDBe RCSB
PDB	List of PDB id codes 2ID5, 4OQT

Gene location (Human)
Chr.	Chromosome 15 (human)
Band	15q24.3	Start	77,613,027 bp
Band	15q24.3	End	77,820,900 bp

Gene location (Mouse)
Chr.	Chromosome 9 (mouse)
Band	9|9 B	Start	56,525,759 bp
Band	9|9 B	End	56,703,752 bp
RNA expression pattern
Bgee	Human / Mouse (ortholog); Top expressed in: prefrontal cortex; right frontal lobe; dorsolateral prefrontal cortex; Brodmann area 9; cingulate gyrus; anterior cingulate cortex; occipital lobe; lateral nuclear group of thalamus; amygdala; primary visual cortex / Top expressed in: visual cortex; primary motor cortex; primary visual cortex; piriform cortex; superior frontal gyrus; cingulate gyrus; subiculum; anterior amygdaloid area; dentate gyrus of hippocampal formation granule cell; prefrontal cortex; More reference expression data
BioGPS	n/a
Gene ontology
Molecular function	protein binding; epidermal growth factor receptor binding
Cellular component	membrane; integral component of membrane; plasma membrane; extracellular space; extracellular matrix
Biological process	negative regulation of axonogenesis; signal transduction; axonogenesis
Sources:Amigo / QuickGO
Orthologs
Databases	NCBI: entry; OMA: entry
Species	Human	Mouse
Entrez	84894	235402
Ensembl	ENSG00000169783	ENSMUSG00000049556
UniProt	Q96FE5	Q9D1T0
RefSeq (mRNA)	NM_001301186; NM_001301187; NM_001301189; NM_001301191; NM_001301192 NM_001301194; NM_001301195; NM_001301197; NM_001301198; NM_001301199; NM_001301200; NM_032808	NM_181074; NM_001311076; NM_001361115; NM_001361116; NM_001361117 NM_001361118; NM_001361119; NM_001361120
RefSeq (protein)	NP_001288115; NP_001288116; NP_001288118; NP_001288120; NP_001288121 NP_001288123; NP_001288124; NP_001288126; NP_001288127; NP_001288128; NP_001288129; NP_116197	NP_001298005; NP_851419; NP_001348044; NP_001348045; NP_001348046 NP_001348047; NP_001348048; NP_001348049
Location (UCSC)	Chr 15: 77.61 – 77.82 Mb	Chr 9: 56.53 – 56.7 Mb
PubMed search
- Wikidata
View/Edit Human	View/Edit Mouse

Leucine-rich repeat and Immunoglobulin-like domain-containing protein 1 also known as LINGO-1 is a protein which is encoded by the LINGO1 gene in humans. It belongs to the family of leucine-rich repeat proteins which are known for playing key roles in the biology of the central nervous system. LINGO-1 is a functional component of the Nogo (neurite outgrowth inhibitor) receptor also known as the reticulon 4 receptor.

It has been suggested that LINGO-1 antagonists such as BIIB033 could significantly improve and regulate survival after neural injury caused by the protein.

== Structure ==
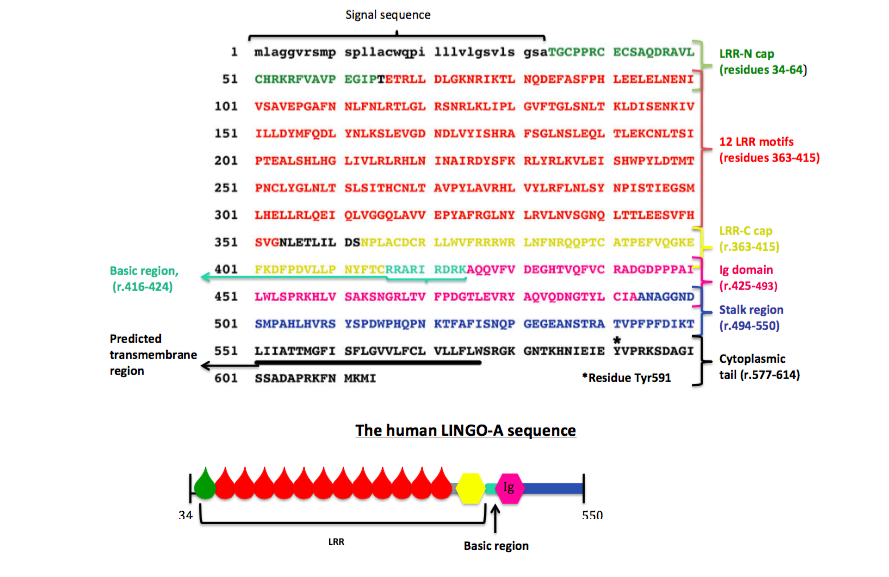
Aminoacidic sequence of the human LINGO-1 protein. The different domains are signaled according to their chemical characteristics and their aminoacids are identified.

The human LINGO-1 is a single-pass type 1 transmembrane protein of 614 amino acids. It contains a signal sequence of 34 residues, followed by a LRR (leucine-rich repeat) domain, an Ig (immunoglobulin-like) domain, a stalk domain, a transmembrane region and a short cytoplasmic tail. As a transmembrane protein, it can mostly be found on the cell membrane.

The LINGO-1 structure has been shown to be highly stable both in its crystal form and in solution, thanks to its leucine-rich repeat Ig-composite fold. Since the tetramer has a very large surface area into the cell membrane, it is thought that this may serve as an efficient and stable binding platform, facilitating the interaction with NgR, p75, TROY complex.

=== Extracellular domain ===
The extracellular domain consists of the signal sequence, 11 LRR motifs comprised between an N-terminal and C-terminal capping domains, and the Immunoglobulin-like (IgC2) domain. The C-terminal LRR domain is essential for the protein's function with its screening for proteins that interact with this domain. The structure, together with biophysical analysis of LINGO-1 properties have revealed that the protein's LRR-Ig composite fold of the protein can drive it to associate with itself in a circular ring-like form, creating a closed and stable tetramer in solution and in crystal.

=== Intracellular domain ===
The intracellular part of the protein is formed by the transmembrane region and a cytoplasmic tail of 38 residues. It contains a canonical Epidermal Growth Factor Receptor (EGFR)-like tyrosine phosphorylation site on the 591 residue that is critical for intracellular signals.

=== Co-receptor ===
LINGO-1 is a co-receptor that interacts with the ligand-binding Nogo-66 receptor (NogoR) in the Nogo receptor signaling complex. The Nogo receptor complex is formed when Nogo-66 binds to its receptor.

LINGO-1 is an homotetramer which forms a ternary complex with RTN4R/NGFR and RTN4R/TNFRSF19.

==== Post-translational modifications ====
LINGO-1 contains several N-glycosylation sites that could have a negative effect on its capacity to self-interact with cis or trans, with other partners, or gangliosides. It also contains high-mannose glycans.

== Tissue distribution ==
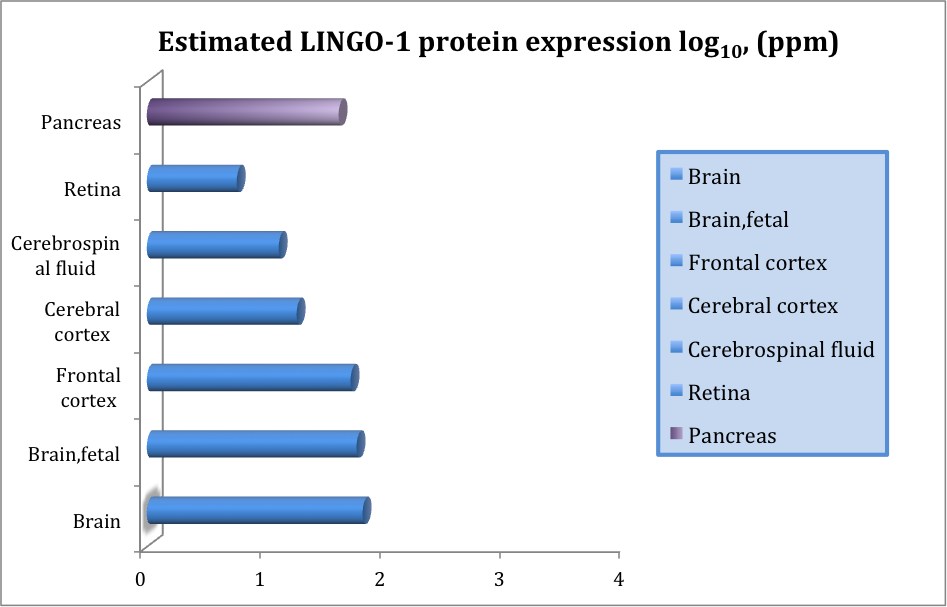
Graphical summary of the expression of the LINGO-1 gene in humans. Blue is for the actions of the protein in the nervous system whereas purple represents the secretory function of LINGO-1 in the pancreas.

LINGO-1 is expressed almost exclusively in the central nervous system (CNS). It can be found in the brain and in neurons and oligodendrocytes. LINGO-1 mRNA is expressed in an almost exclusive manner in the central nervous system during both embryonic and postnatal stages. It is targeted to the plasma membrane of neurons, but it is possible that a smaller quantities of the protein may be found in other intracellular compartments. Its highest expression is in specific adult human brain regions such as the cerebral cortex, a region involved in sensory-motor function, cognition and working memory; the hippocampus, responsible for long-term memory and the encoding and retrieval of multi-sensory information; the amygdala, implicated in the stress response; as well as the thalamus, with a more constant and basal level of expression across the remainder of the brain.

== Function and mode of action ==
Since LINGO-1 is a leucine-rich repeat protein, which are known for their important role in protein-protein interactions in a wide variety of cellular processes and their implication in important functions like neuronal differentiation and growth or the regulation of axon guidance and regeneration processes, it is logical to deduce that its functions are linked with the nervous system.

LINGO-1 is an essential negative regulator of myelination. It has been implicated in the inhibition of axon regeneration through a ternary complex formed with NgR1/Nogo-66 (ligand-binding subunit) and p75 (signal transducing subunit). NgR1 relies on its co-receptors for transmembrane signalling. The three major myelin-associated inhibitory factors are Nogo, oligodendrocyte myelin glycoprotein, and myelin-associated glycoprotein which all share this trimolecular receptor complex. The inhibitory action is achieved through RhoA-GTP upregulation in response to the presence of MOG, MAG or Nogo-66 in the central nervous system. LINGO-1 also inhibits oligodendrocyte precursor differentiation and myelination, by a mechanism that also involves activation of RhoA, but which apparently does not require p75 or NgR1.

LINGO-1 is involved in the regulation of neural apoptosis by inhibiting WNK3 kinase activity. It has been shown that blocking the extracellular domain of LINGO-1 disrupts the interaction between receptor kinases and LINGO-1 which directly attenuates inhibition of neuronal survival. However among the four WNK family members, only WNK3 has been shown to regulate and increase cell survival in a caspase-3-dependent pathway.

To be able to understand how these components regulate signalling processes an experiment has been set up "model of serum deprivation" (SD) to prompt neuronal apoptosis. Research shows that treatments either with a construct containing the IgC2 or EGFR domains in the LINGO1 protein or with Nogo66 which act like a NgR1 agonist, therefore initiating a physiological response when combined with the receptor, resulting in an increased rate of apoptosis in primary cultured cortical neurons under SD.

In addition, reducing the expression levels of the serine/threonine Kinase WNK3 (using gene silencing via RNA interference (ShRNA)) or inhibiting its kinase activity had similar effects on the survival of such neurons. The adverse effects of Nogo66 have proved to enhance the co-association of LINGO1 and WNK3, causing the binding of WNK3 to the intracellular domain of LINGO1 leading to reduced WNK3 kinase activity. LINGO1 promotes neural apoptosis by inhibiting WNK3 kinase activity.

== Signaling pathways ==
LINGO-1 is able to interact with different co-factors and co-receptors, which can lead to the activation o signaling pathways that can have an effect on the regulation of neuronal survival, axon regeneration, oligodendrocyte differentiation, or myelination processes in the brain.

Known interactions are with proteins such as Oligodendrocyte-myelinn glycoprotein, Nogo-A (neurotic outgrowth inhibitor), and myelin associated glycoproteins. LINGO-1 also interacts with transmembrane proteins: EFGR, along with its ligand epidermal growth factor (EFG); brain derived neurotrophic factor (BNDF) and its receptor, amyloid precursor protein (APP), and tropomyosin receptor kinase A (TrkA). There are other interactions with proteins that are implicated in neurological and psychiatric disorders: WNK lysine deficient protein in kinase 1 (WNK1), mitogen activated protein kinase 2/3 (MEK 2/3), extracellular signal reduced kinase 5 (ERK5), RhoA, and others.

== Neurological and psychiatric disorders ==
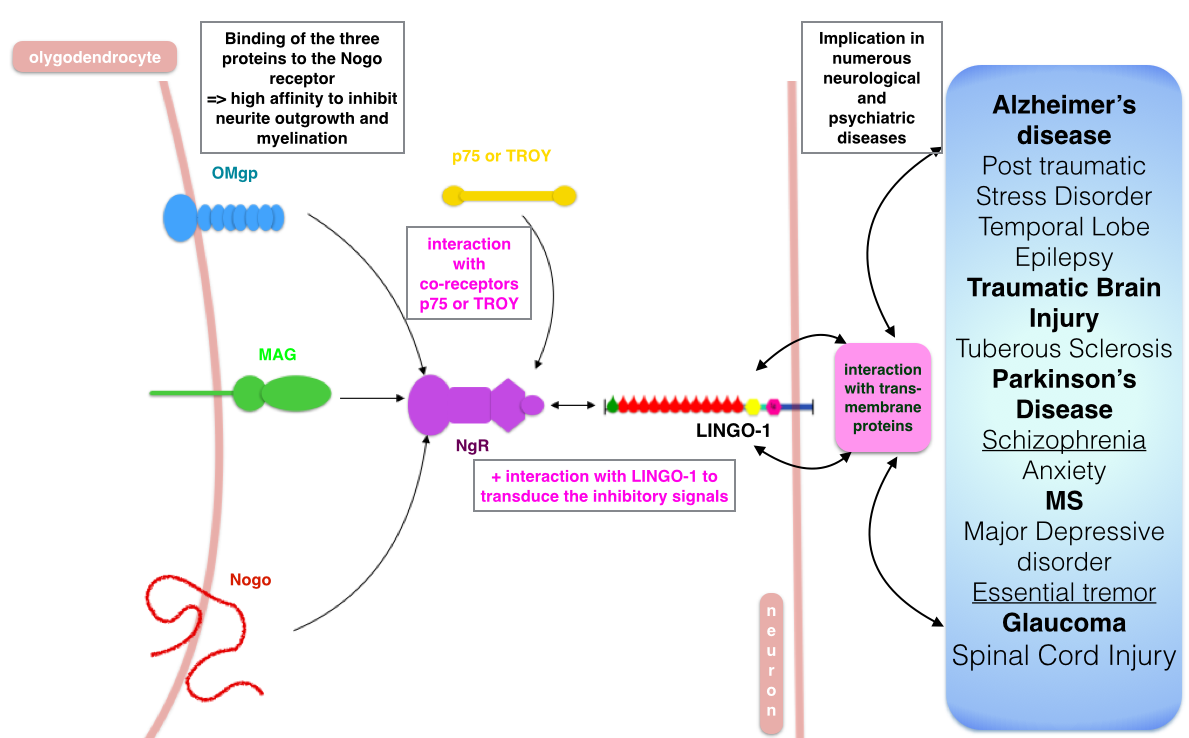
Representation of LINGO-1 signaling pathways that are implicated in neurological and psychiatric disorders. Interactions with the principal proteins mentioned and their pathological consequences.

LINGO-1 is coded by the LINGO-1 gene, which is located on the human chromosome 15, more precisely on the locus 15q24-26, which is a region that has a primordial implication in number of psychiatric, addictive and anxiety related disorders. Genomic alterations of this regions can be factors for disorders such as schizophrenia, depression, autism, panic disorder or anxiety.

Brain regions identified as highly expressing Lingo-1 transcripts have also been heavily implicated in both neurological and psychiatric disorders such as spinal cord injury, traumatic brain injury, multiple sclerosis (MS), Parkinson's disease, essential tremor (ET), Alzheimer's disease, epilepsy and glaucoma (central nervous system diseases); as well as stress and panic disorders, schizophrenia, amnesia, etc. The role of Lingo-1 in these neurological disorders consists on its inhibitory role in neurite outgrowth, oligodendrocyte differentiation and myelination, making it difficult for the nervous system to regenerate the injured areas, whether these injuries come from endogenous or exogenous processes.

=== Spinal cord injury ===
Spinal cord injury results in the damage of the axonal tracts whose function is to control motor and sensory activity. This protein has been found in this axonal tracts of adolescent rat spinal cords following injury. Furthermore, a five time increase in Lingo-1 mRNA levels was detected 14 days post injury. Lingo-1-Fc, a soluble form of Lingo-1, has also been shown to antagonize Lingo-1 signaling pathways by inhibiting the binding of Lingo-1 to NgR, in consequence, vast improvements in the functional recovery of rats following lateral hemisection of the spinal cord were observed.

=== Essential tremor and Parkinson ===
Essential tremor, one of the most common neurological diseases, is characterized by postural and action tremor. Recent research shows that around the 20% of people who suffer this disease have an increase of the protein LINGO1 in their cerebellum, therefore linking LINGO1 to essential tremor would result in the development of more effective symptomatic therapies and treatment.

It has been found that there is a marker in LINGO-1 genome, a variant (rs9652490) that is significantly associated with essential tremor, increasing the risk of having the pathology.

As for Parkinson's disease, which is also an age-related movement disorder, it was discovers that levels of LINGO-1 are more elevated in the substantia nigra and cerebellum of post-mortem Parkinson's disease brains compared to control groups. Dudem et al., (2020) also demonstrated that LINGO1 is a novel regulatory subunit of large conductance, Ca2+ activated (BK) channels. It is thought that dopamine neuron survival and behavioral abnormalities are due to the over expression of LINGO-1 in Parkinson's patients.

=== Traumatic brain injury ===
Traumatic brain injury involves the necrotic and apoptotic death of brain cells in vulnerable and delicate areas such as the cerebral cortex and hippocampus, where it is known that there is an expression of Lingo-1 in both development and the adult stage of life. RhoA signaling is largely responsible for the neuronal response to neuronal inhibitory proteins and the regeneration (or lack of in case of its activation) of damaged axons. Receptor Lingo-1 stimulates RhoA, which activates ROCK (RhoA kinase) which, in turn, stimulates LIM kinase, which then stimulates cofilin, which effectively reorganizes the actin cytoskeleton of the cell. In the case of neurons, activation of this pathway results in growth cone collapse, therefore inhibits the growth and repair of neural pathways and axons. Inhibition of this pathway by its various components usually results in some level of improved re-myelination. The use of Lingo-1-Fc as an antagonist for Lingo-1 shows the inhibition of RhoA activation. Since this soluble form of Lingo-1 is able to block the interactions between Lingo-1 and NgR, it is reasonable to think that the blockade of RhoA occurs at the level of Lingo-1/NgR/p75 or TROY complex, leading to the conclusion that Lingo-1plays a very important part in the lack of re-myelination, repair of neural and axon injuries, etc.

=== Schizophrenia ===
Schizophrenia is a chronic, severe and disabling brain disorder.

As said before, leucine-rich repeat and immunoglobulin domain-containing protein (Lingo-1) is an essential negative regulator of myelination and neurite extension. Both myelination and neurite outgrowth occur during brain maturation, and it is during this late period of brain development (adolescence and early adulthood) when schizophrenia is first expressed. In fact, myelination peaks during late adolescence, coinciding with the onset of schizophrenia. Consequently, an excessive action of Lingo-1 through demyelination and blocking neurite extension may be one of the possible causes of this disorder.

The brain regions which are highly disrupted in the pathophysiology of this disease are hippocampus and dorsolateral prefrontal cortex. Therefore, clinical studies have been developed in order to study these brain regions in people who suffer schizophrenia. To investigate the hypothesis that myelin fraction is lower in schizophrenia patients than in healthy subjects, a technique called magnetic resonance spectroscopy (MRS), which allows analysis of myelin, is used. This studies reported that there was in fact, a dysfunctional profile of myelination in these two areas of the brain in schizophrenia sufferers.

Post-mortem studies were then realized in order to compare the levels of the protein Lingo-1 in these two brain regions (hippocampus and dorsolateral prefrontal cortex) between schizophrenia and healthy subjects. Effectively, it was shown that the levels of Lingo-1 where significantly higher in schizophrenia than in control groups.

Taking this into account, there is a clear relationship in between schizophrenia and demyelination, therefore, this disease is linked with Lingo-1 protein. Very possibly, an effective treatment of this disease would be the use of Lingo-1 antagonists, such as Anti-Lingo-1, which would offset the lack of myelin and hopefully avoid the disease. Thus, this treatment is still in ways of development and research.

=== Multiple sclerosis ===
Multiple sclerosis is among the most common neurological disorders in young adults and it consists in the destructions and damage of the central nervous system (CNS) myelin due to persistent inflammation in the brain and spinal cord. This demyelination is shown to cause mitochondrial dysfunction in axons, leading to their degeneration. These damages disrupt the ability and capacity of the CNS to communicate, causing, therefore, a wide range of symptoms including physical, mental and even psychiatric ones. The best way of re-myelination is encouraging the differentiation of endogenous adult precursor cells into mature oligodendrocytes in the injured regions. These precursor cells are called oligodendrocyte precursor cells (OPCs). It is known that in early stages of MS re-myelination can be achieved successfully and efficiently whereas it cannot in late and progressive stages. Regarding Lingo-1, we know that its signaling pathway is a negative regulator of OPCs differentiation, as well as Notch's and Wnt's.

Lingo-1 antagonists are able to promote re-myelination in CNS by means of stimulating OPCs differentiation which was before blocked by this protein. This has been seen in several experiments that resulted in significant increases of oligodendrocytes differentiation by targeting Lingo-1 with its antagonists, such as the antibody Anti-LINGO-1 (BIIB033).

=== Glaucoma ===
Glaucoma is a group of eye diseases characterized by features including morphological changes in the optic nerve head and therefore in the visual fields of the patients. There are two main types; open-angle and closed-angle glaucoma. The loss of RGCs (retinal ganglion cells) and their axons results in visual field loss. Increasing evidence also supports the existence of compartmentalized degeneration in synapses. It has been shown that the first symptoms of this disease are usually ocular hypertension. Elevated IOP (intraocular pressure) has been identified as the etiology of glaucoma which causes neural RCG degeneration in the retina.

LINGO1 was found to be expressed in the normal retina and was up regulated in RCGs after the induction of ocular hypertension in a rat chronic glaucoma model. Hence LINGO1 functions as a negative regulator of neuronal survival, axonal regeneration and oligodendrocyte differentiation. LINGO1 binds with TrkA and inhibits myelination by oligodendrocytes in vitro. Further more it binds to BDNF receptor and TrkB inhibiting the activation of TkrB by binding of BNDF after the induction of ocular hypertension.

==== Neuroprotection of RCGs ====
Even though BDNF is an important survival factor for RGCs both during development and adult life, BDNF can only slightly increase the survival rate of RCGs, and does not significantly “rescue” injured RCGs in hypertensive eyes after episcleral vein cauterization. The negative regulatory function of LINGO1 may be involved in the limited neuroprotective effect of BDNF and it could be reversed after blocking LINGO1 function.

LINGO 1 negatively regulates TrkB activation through the signalling pathway of BDNF/TrKB, and anti-LINGO-1 exerts neuroprotective effects via activation of BDNF/TrkB.

Better than BDNF and BII003 (LINGO1 antagonist) alone, the combined treatment of both provides long term RCG neuroprotection after the induction of ocular hypertension. In conclusion BII033 may provide an attractive therapeutic strategy to promote neuroprotection in glaucoma.

== Antagonists ==
Blocking the activity of lingo-1 has several potential applications in the treatment of neurodegenerative diseases.

(A myelin sheath is a lipid protective coating that covers and protects nerve cells (axons). These sheaths makes possible rapid and accurate transmission of nerve signals. Multiple sclerosis destroys these myelin sheaths, leading to a deterioration in nerve signal transmission. Once this protective myelin coating is stripped away, it leads to apoptosis of the neuron; axons gradually die, causing the muscle spasms and paralysis that are characteristic of the disease.)

=== Anti-lingo-1 (BIIB033) ===
Anti-lingo-1 (BIIB033) is a monoclonal antibody specific to the lingo-1 protein and is designed to promote remyelination (the formation of new myelin on axons) and neuroprotection. The protein lingo-1 inhibits the action of myelin-making cells, oligodendrocytes, which are surrounding the axons. Its antagonist, the antibody anti-lingo-1 would block this protein and even would be capable of myelin repair.

A number of clinical trials of the anti-lingo-1 antibody drug (BIIB033) have either been completed or are underway. Acute optic neuritis (AON) is a disease which involves damage within the nerve fibers and loss of myelin within the optic nerve (it normally involves one eye and it's characterized by inflammation). One clinical trial studying the effects on BIIB033 on acute optic neuritis. Throughout the study, optic nerve conduction latency was measured (the time for a signal to travel from the retina to the brain's visual cortex). As about half of patients with optic neuritis will later develop multiple sclerosis, BIIB033 antibody treatment is also being considered for the former disease. It is thought that Anti-Lingo-1 would produce the necessary myelin to avoid neurodegeneration.
