= Yop1p =

REEP 5 sequence

DP1/Yop1p is an integral membrane protein family that, along with the reticulons, is responsible for the shape of the tubular endoplasmic reticulum (ER) in yeast and mammalian cells. Furthermore, it is also believed that they might be involved in sheet ER formation.

About half the total area of membrane in a eukaryotic cell encloses the space of the endoplasmic reticulum. The ER is an extremely dynamic membrane organelle which consists of the nuclear envelope and the peripheral ER. It is organized into a netlike labyrinth of branching tubules and flattened sheets that extends throughout the cytosol. These tubules and sheets are interconnected and their membrane is continuous with the outer nuclear membrane. The ER and nuclear membranes form a continuous layer enclosing a single internal space, called the ER lumen, which often occupies the 10% of the total cell volume. However, this unique space has several morphologically distinct areas. Thus, the peripheral ER is composed of a polygonal network of tubules and interdispersed sheets that spreads from the nuclear envelope to the cell cortex.

At an ultrastructural level, the ER can be classified into two types, rough ER (RER) and smooth ER (SER). The RER has a sheet-like morphology and its main feature is the presence of ribosomes. Conversely, the SER is devoid of ribosomes and tends to be more tubular in structure.

The peripheral ER is dynamic: the tubules continuously form and disappear and the sheets rearrange. ER shaping proteins (reticulons and Dp1/Yop1p) play key roles in generating and maintaining this unique reticular morphology of the ER. An intact peripheral ER is functionally important in higher eukaryotes. Failure to maintain this structure could be related to certain neurological disorders.

In all eukaryotic cells, the ER plays an important role in decisive processes, such as the biosynthesis of secretory and membrane proteins, protein modification, lipid synthesis and calcium storage (used in many cell signaling responses).

Both mammalian DP1 (for "deleted in polyposis") and Yop1p in yeast cells are ubiquitously expressed and found in most eukaryotic cells. They are predominantly localized to the tubular ER and to the highly curved edges of ER sheets.

== Function ==
DP1/Yop1p proteins play an important role in the morphology of the ER as they are one of the major components that determine and maintain the shape of ER tubules, which are long cylindrical units with high membrane curvature in their cross-section and a diameter that usually fluctuates between 60 and 100 nm. Both the reticulons and DP1/Yop1p are tethered to the cytoskeleton and diffuse slowly in the ER membrane, probably due to the fact that they form oligomers. The structural regularity of the different units that form the ER indicates that tubules are shaped actively. It is believed that DP1/Yop1p proteins may stabilize the high curvature of ER tubules by "wedging" themselves into the outer membrane leaflet, creating the necessary increase in local surface area and membrane asymmetry needed for high membrane curvature

== Structure related to function ==
The functionality of these proteins is based on their specific molecular design and interaction patterns. Although reticulons do not share any primary sequence homology with DP1/Yop1p proteins, both families have a conserved domain of approximately 200 amino acids containing two hydrophobic segments (longer than conventional α-helical transmembrane domains). Each segment forms a hairpin with the ER tubule lipid bilayer so that hydrophilic segments are found in the cytoplasm, along with C-terminal and N-terminal. These hairpins are long enough to penetrate completely the outer lipid layer and partially the inner one forming the mentioned "wedge" that increases the surface of the outer membrane leaflet provoking local curvature in the ER tubules. When "wedging", hydrophobic interactions occur between the hairpins and the lipid bilayer.

All DP1/Yop1p proteins and reticulons also form higher-order oligomers that form arc-like structures that mold the lipid bilayer of the tubule. This is a common mechanism used by curvature-generating proteins and is known as 'scaffolding'. These arc-like structures, though, do not completely surround the tubule, so they do not interfere with nor block long-distance diffusion of other membrane proteins. Furthermore, unlike other typical curvature scaffolds, such as coat proteins, it is required just a small portion of reticulons and DP1/Yop1p proteins to maintain the curvature.

These two mechanisms are used simultaneously to stabilize the high-curvature of ER tubules. Keeping the ER shape is a challenging task, so this membrane organelle must combine both structural stability and high plasticity to carry out some of its functions, such as signaling and transport processes.

The shape of the tubules is given by the reticulons and DP1/Yop1p, whereas their fusion into the network is brought about by membrane-bound GTPases that include the atlastins, Sey1p, and RHD3.

== Proteins within the DP1/Yop1p superfamily ==
REEP (for Receptor Expression-Enhancing protein) proteins are member of the DP1/Yop1p family. There are six of them in humans and other mammals but species such as the fruit fly Drosophila or the worm Caenorhabditis elegans have one or more proteins belonging to the DP1/Yop1p family. Yeast, for example, also contains one of them: Yop1p. REEP proteins can be classified into two groups or sub-families depending on their sequence. All of them have paired hydrophobic segments but the first domain of that kind is much shorter in REEP 1 to 4. Besides, REEP 5 and 6 have a clear cytoplasmic segment and a shorter C-terminal region. As for Yop1p, its structure is closer to that of REEP 5 and 6. These structural differences are closely related to the proteins' functions, that differ slightly between them. For instance, REEP 1 to 4 are believed to have other functions such as increasing the cell surface expression of odorant receptors, apart from their ER-shaping roles.

== Role in disease ==
Hereditary spastic paraplegias (HSPs) are a group of inherited neurological disorders which are characterized by progressive spasticity and weakness of the lower extremities. Although over 40 genetic loci have been reported responsible for HSPs, 50% of HSP patients show pathogenic mutations in 1 of just 3 genes: spastin, atlastin-1 and REEP1. Atlastin-1 also participates in the generation of tubular ER, whereas spastin is an ATPase linked to several cellular activities that functions in microtubule severing and plays a big role on axon branching and elongation in neurons. These three proteins interact with each other on the tubular membrane, where REEP1 interacts with them by means of its intramembrane, hydrophobic hairpin domain. A mutation in just one of these proteins can lead to HSP.
