= Biogenesis (disambiguation) =

Biogenesis is the generation of life from existing life.

Biogenesis may also refer to:

- "Biogenesis" (The X-Files)
- Biogenesis baseball scandal (involving MLB players taking growth-hormone)
- Mitochondrial biogenesis
- Organelle biogenesis
- Ribosome biogenesis
- Recapitulation theory, the biogenetic law of Ernst Haeckel

== See also ==
- Abiogenesis, the generation of life from non-living matter
- Biomolecule
- Organic chemistry
