= RTN3 =

Protein-coding gene in the species Homo sapiens

Identifiers
- Aliases: RTN3, ASYIP, HAP, NSPL2, NSPLII, RTN3-A1, reticulon 3
- External IDs: OMIM: 604249; MGI: 1339970; GeneCards: RTN3

Gene location (Human)
Chr.	Chromosome 11 (human)
Band	11q13.1	Start	63,681,446 bp
Band	11q13.1	End	63,759,891 bp

Gene location (Mouse)
Chr.	Chromosome 19 (mouse)
Band	19|19 A	Start	7,403,266 bp
Band	19|19 A	End	7,460,646 bp
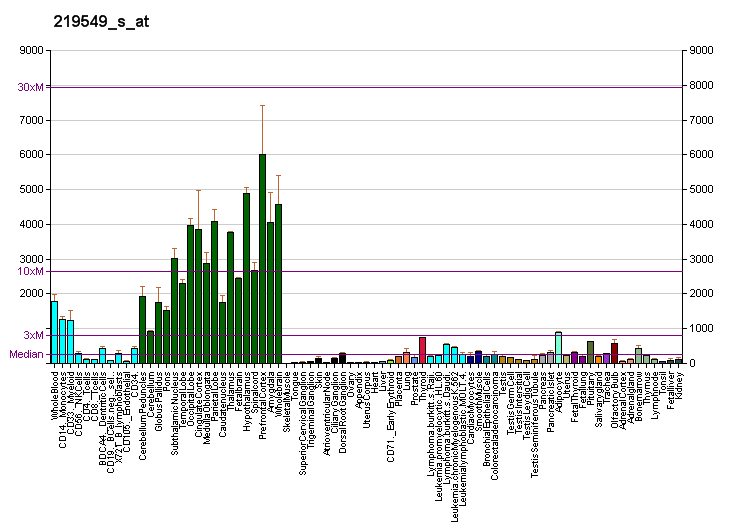
RNA expression pattern
Bgee	Human / Mouse (ortholog); Top expressed in: Brodmann area 9; prefrontal cortex; right frontal lobe; anterior cingulate cortex; ganglionic eminence; pons; ventricular zone; hypothalamus; C1 segment; amygdala / Top expressed in: facial motor nucleus; anterior horn of spinal cord; central gray substance of midbrain; nucleus of stria terminalis; primary motor cortex; medial vestibular nucleus; prefrontal cortex; motor neuron; dorsomedial hypothalamic nucleus; medial dorsal nucleus; More reference expression data
BioGPS	More reference expression data
Gene ontology
Molecular function	protein binding
Cellular component	integral component of membrane; Golgi membrane; Golgi apparatus; endoplasmic reticulum; membrane; endoplasmic reticulum membrane; plasma membrane; extracellular space; synapse
Biological process	endoplasmic reticulum tubular network organization; viral process; vesicle-mediated transport; apoptotic process; endoplasmic reticulum tubular network formation
Sources:Amigo / QuickGO
Orthologs
Databases	NCBI: entry; OMA: entry
Species	Human	Mouse
Entrez	10313	20168
Ensembl	ENSG00000133318	ENSMUSG00000024758
UniProt	O95197	Q9ES97
RefSeq (mRNA)	NM_001265589; NM_001265590; NM_001265591; NM_006054; NM_201428 NM_201429; NM_201430	NM_001003930; NM_001003933; NM_001003934; NM_001271486; NM_001271487 NM_053076
RefSeq (protein)	NP_001252518; NP_001252519; NP_001252520; NP_006045; NP_958831 NP_958832; NP_958833	NP_001003933; NP_001003934; NP_001258415; NP_001258416; NP_444306
Location (UCSC)	Chr 11: 63.68 – 63.76 Mb	Chr 19: 7.4 – 7.46 Mb
PubMed search
- Wikidata
View/Edit Human	View/Edit Mouse

Reticulon-3 is a protein that in humans is encoded by the RTN3 gene.

The reticulons are a group of highly conserved genes with preferential expression in neuroendocrine tissues (see, e.g., RTN1; MIM 600865).[supplied by OMIM]
