= Joan A. Steitz =

American biochemist

Joan Steitz
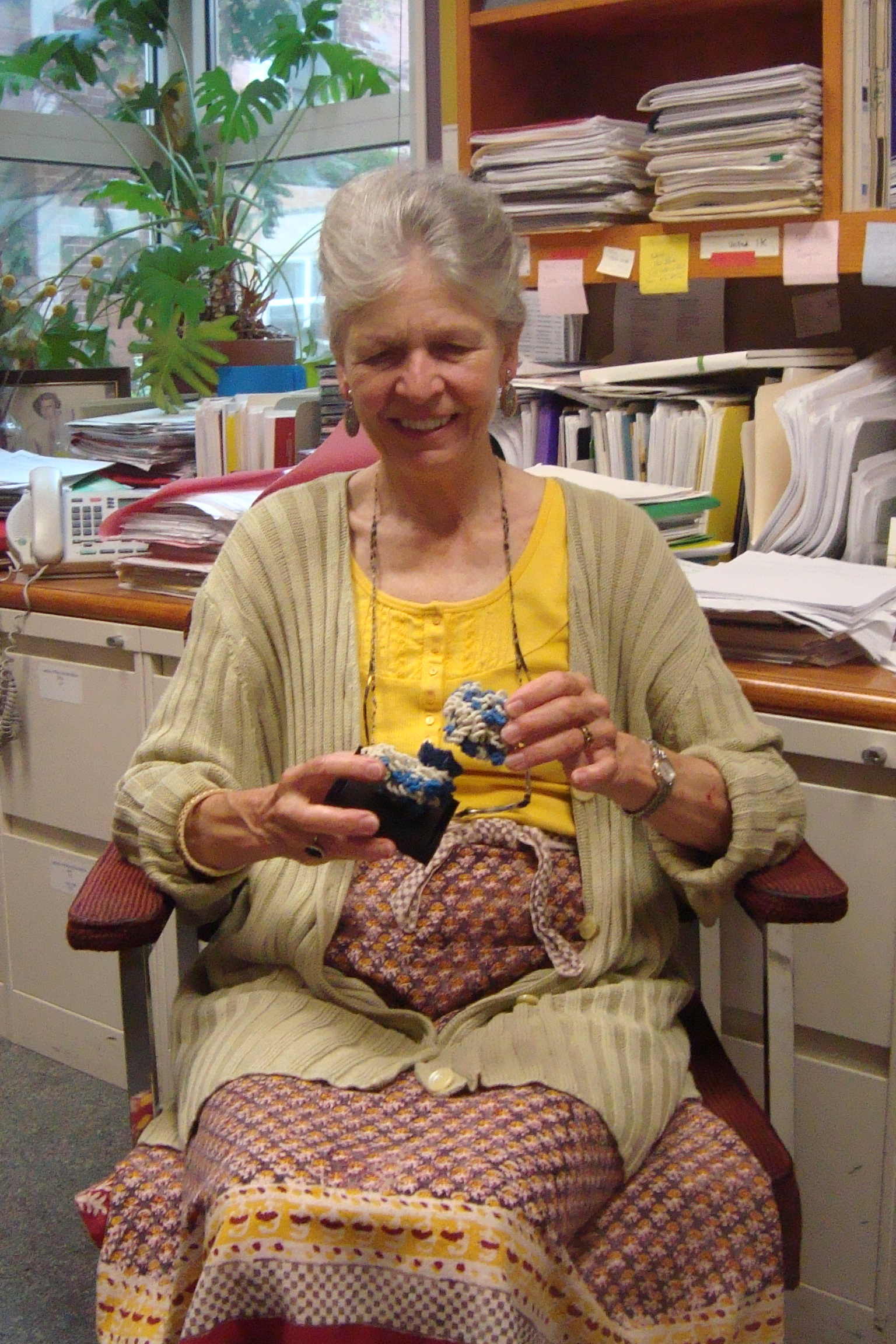
- Born: Joan Elaine Argetsinger; January 26, 1941 (age 85); Minneapolis, Minnesota, US
- Education: Antioch College (BS); Harvard University (PhD)
- Known for: Discovery of sites, sequences, and mechanism for mRNA binding to ribosomes; First discovery of RNAs not directly involved in protein assembly; Discovery of snRNPs and their role in splicing eukaryotic mRNAs out of longer transcripts
- Spouse: Thomas Steitz
- Children: 1
- Awards: NAS Award in Molecular Biology (1982); National Medal of Science (1986); Max Delbrück Medal (2000); Gairdner Foundation International Award (2006); Pearl Meister Greengard Prize (2012); Wolf Prize in Medicine (2021); Lasker–Koshland Special Achievement Award in Medical Science (2018)
- Scientific career
- Fields: Biochemistry; Molecular biology
- Workplaces: Howard Hughes Medical Institute; Laboratory of Molecular Biology; Yale University
- Thesis: Studies of the R17A protein (1968)
- Doctoral advisor: James D. Watson
- Doctoral students: Sandra Wolin, Gia Voeltz, Erik J. Sontheimer
- Website: medicine.yale.edu/lab/steitz; www.hhmi.org/scientists/joan-steitz

Joan Elaine Argetsinger Steitz (born January 26, 1941) is an American biochemist and molecular biologist, Sterling Professor of Molecular Biophysics and Biochemistry at Yale University and Investigator at the Howard Hughes Medical Institute. She also serves as the Director of the Molecular Genetics Program at the Boyer Center for Molecular Medicine. She is known for her discoveries involving RNA, including insights into how ribosomes interact with messenger RNA by complementary base pairing and that introns are spliced by small nuclear ribonucleic proteins (snRNPs), which occur in eukaryotes. In September 2018, Steitz won the Lasker-Koshland Award for Special Achievement in Medical Science. The Lasker award is often referred to as the 'American Nobel' because 87 of the former recipients have gone on to win Nobel prizes.

== Early life and education ==
Steitz was born in Minneapolis, Minnesota. She grew up in Minnesota in the 1950s and 60s and attended the all-girls Northrop Collegiate School high school, which only offered three science classes.

In 1963, Steitz received her Bachelor of Science degree in chemistry from Antioch College, Ohio, where she first became interested in molecular biology at Alex Rich's Massachusetts Institute of Technology laboratory as an Antioch "coop" intern.

After completing her undergraduate degree, Steitz applied to medical school rather than graduate school since she knew of women medical doctors but not women scientists. She was accepted to Harvard Medical School, but having been excited by a summer working as a bench scientist in the laboratory of Joseph Gall at the University of Minnesota, she declined the invitation to Harvard Medical School and instead applied to Harvard's new program in biochemistry and molecular biology. There, she was the first woman graduate student to join the laboratory of Nobel Laureate James Watson, with whom she first worked on bacteriophage RNA.

== Career ==
Steitz describes her excitement about research in the field of biology, her contributions, and their vast implications on health today.

Steitz completed postdoctoral research at the Medical Research Council (MRC) Laboratory of Molecular Biology (LMB) at the University of Cambridge (UK), where she collaborated with Francis Crick, Sydney Brenner, and Mark Bretscher. At the LMB, Steitz focused on the question of how bacteria know where to start the "reading frame" on mRNA. In the process, Steitz discovered the exact sequences on a mature RNA virus encoding three proteins where the virus mRNA binds bacterial ribosomes to produce proteins. In 1969 she published a seminal paper in Nature showing the nucleotide sequence of the binding start points.

In 1970, Steitz joined the faculty at Yale. In 1975, she published a research finding for which she is widely known, demonstrating that ribosomes use complementary base pairing to identify the start site on mRNA.

In 1980, Steitz in collaboration with Michael Lerner published another critical paper, using immunoprecipitation with human antibodies from patients with autoimmunity to isolate and identify snRNPs (pronounced "snurps") and detect their role in splicing. A snRNP is a specific short length of RNA, around 150 nucleotides long, associated with protein, that is involved in splicing introns out of newly transcribed RNA (pre-mRNA), a component of the spliceosomes. Steitz's paper "set the field ahead by light years and heralded the avalanche of small RNAs that have since been discovered to play a role in multiple steps in RNA biosynthesis," noted Susan Berget.

Steitz later discovered another kind of snRNP particle, the snoRNP, involved in an important minority of mRNA splicing reactions. Via analysis of the genetic locations of the genes for snoRNPs, she demonstrated conclusively that introns are not "junk DNA" as they had often been described. Her work helps explain the phenomenon of "alternative RNA splicing." Her discovery of the snRNPs and snoRNPs explains a mysterious finding: humans have only double the number of genes of a fruit fly. "The reason we can get away with so few genes is that when you have these bits of nonsense, you can splice them out in different ways," she said. "Sometimes you can get rid of things and add things because of this splicing process so that each gene has slightly different protein products that can do slightly different things. So it multiplies up the information content in each of our genes."

In 1998 Steitz's research lab reported that the nuclear-cytoplasmic shuttling protein, HuR (ELAV-like protein1), could bind to the AU-rich element (ARE) in unstable mRNAs and increase their stability. This work expanded the mechanistic understanding of the dual role that an ARE can play in posttranscriptional gene regulation.

Steitz's research may yield new insights into the diagnosis and treatment of autoimmune disorders such as lupus, which develop when patients make anti-nuclear antibodies against their own DNA, snRNPs, or ribosomes.

Steitz has commented on the sexist treatment of women in science, and has been a "tireless promoter of women in science," noted Christine Guthrie, who described Steitz as "one of the greatest scientists of our generation."

Steitz has served in numerous professional capacities, including as scientific director of the Jane Coffin Childs Memorial Fund for Medical Research (1991–2002) and as editorial board member of Genes & Development.

== Personal life ==
Steitz (born Joan Argetsinger) married Thomas Steitz, also Sterling Professor of Molecular Biophysics and Biochemistry at Yale and the 2009 Nobel Prize in Chemistry laureate, in 1966. They have one son, Jon.

== Awards and honors ==
- 2021 - Warren Alpert Foundation Prize.
- 2021 - Prize Medal Lecture.
- 2021 – Wolf Prize in Medicine.
- 2020 – Microbiology Society Prize Medal by the Microbiology Society to those who have made an impact beyond microbiology.
- 2018 – Lasker-Koshland Award for Special Achievement in Medical Science.
- 2014 – Royal Society of London.
- 2009 – Biochemical Society Jubilee Lecture Award.
- 2011 – Columbia University Honorary Doctorate of Science].
- 2008 – Albany Medical Center Prize (shared with Elizabeth Blackburn).
- 2006 – Rosalind E. Franklin Award for Women in Science, National Cancer Institute.
- 2006 – Gairdner Foundation International Award.
- 2005 – E.B. Wilson Medal, American Society for Cell Biology.
- 2004 – RNA Society Lifetime Achievement Award.
- 2004 – The Caledonian Research Foundation (CRF) Prize Lectureship in Biomedical Sciences and Arts and Letters, Royal Society of Edinburgh.
- 2003 – FASEB Excellence in Science Award.
- 2002 – Lewis S. Rosenstiel Award for Distinguished Basic Medical Science.
- 2001 – L'Oréal-UNESCO Award for Women in Science.
- 1992 – Golden Plate Award of the American Academy of Achievement.
- 1992 – Elected to the American Philosophical Society.
- 1989 – Warren Triennial Prize.
- 1988 – Dickson Prize for Science.
- 1986 – National Medal of Science, National Science Foundation.
- 1983 – Member, National Academy of Sciences.
- 1983 – Lee Howley, Sr. Award for Arthritis Research.
- 1982 – NAS Award in Molecular Biology.
- 1982 – American Academy of Arts and Sciences.
- 1976 – Eli Lilly Award in Biological Chemistry.
- 1975 – Passano Foundation Young Scientist Award.

Her nomination for the Royal Society reads:

Joan Steitz is one of the pioneers of the field of RNA biology who is world-renowned for her many seminal contributions. She showed how ribosomal RNA is used to initiate translation at the start site of mRNA. She discovered spliceosomes, the particles that are the sites of splicing of pre-messenger RNA into the final mature mRNA and elucidated many of their roles. She discovered that introns, which were thought to be inert, code for sno RNAs that target the modification of other cellular RNAs during their maturation. More recently she has found new roles for microRNAs in gene regulation.
