= TMEM33 =

Protein-coding gene in humans

Identifiers
- Aliases: TMEM33, 1600019D15Rik, SHINC3, SHINC-3, transmembrane protein 33, Pom33
- External IDs: OMIM: 618515; MGI: 1915128; GeneCards: TMEM33

Gene location (Human)
Chr.	Chromosome 4 (human)
Band	4p13	Start	41,935,129 bp
Band	4p13	End	41,960,803 bp

Gene location (Mouse)
Chr.	Chromosome 5 (mouse)
Band	5|5 C3.1	Start	67,417,908 bp
Band	5|5 C3.1	End	67,448,804 bp
RNA expression pattern
Bgee	Human / Mouse (ortholog); Top expressed in: buccal mucosa cell; retinal pigment epithelium; islet of Langerhans; mucosa of sigmoid colon; middle temporal gyrus; internal globus pallidus; skin of thigh; corpus epididymis; gums; gingival epithelium / Top expressed in: Epithelium of choroid plexus; right kidney; seminal vesicula; epithelium of stomach; proximal tubule; nasal epithelium; olfactory epithelium; gastrula; epithelium of small intestine; primitive streak; More reference expression data
BioGPS	n/a
Gene ontology
Molecular function	structural constituent of nuclear pore; protein binding
Cellular component	melanosome; integral component of membrane; integral component of endoplasmic reticulum membrane; nuclear pore; membrane; endoplasmic reticulum membrane; nuclear envelope; nucleus; endoplasmic reticulum
Biological process	positive regulation of IRE1-mediated unfolded protein response; nuclear pore complex assembly; regulation of endoplasmic reticulum tubular network organization; response to endoplasmic reticulum stress; positive regulation of PERK-mediated unfolded protein response; nucleocytoplasmic transport
Sources:Amigo / QuickGO
Orthologs
Databases	NCBI: entry; OMA: entry
Species	Human	Mouse
Entrez	55161	67878
Ensembl	ENSG00000109133	ENSMUSG00000037720
UniProt	P57088	Q9CR67
RefSeq (mRNA)	NM_018126	NM_001285452; NM_028975; NM_030108
RefSeq (protein)	NP_060596	NP_001272381; NP_083251; NP_084384
Location (UCSC)	Chr 4: 41.94 – 41.96 Mb	Chr 5: 67.42 – 67.45 Mb
PubMed search
- Wikidata
View/Edit Human	View/Edit Mouse

Transmembrane protein 33 is a protein that in humans, is encoded by the TMEM33 gene, also known as SHINC3. Another name for the TMEM33 protein is DB83.

== Gene ==
In humans, this gene’s DNA location is the short arm of chromosome 4, loci position: 4p13. The genomic range is 41937502-41956213, spanning 18.7 kb, on the positive strand. Transmembrane protein 33 is ubiquitously expressed, but is particularly highly expressed in the blood, lymph nodes, bone, and adipose tissue.

=== Promoter ===
Transcription factors with the highest matrix binding affinity to GXP_4428588

A promoter sequence upstream of TMEM33 is GXP_4428588. This 1069 base pair promoter sequence spans 41936535-41937603 on human chromosome 4. The promoter sequence overlaps with the 5' untranslated region, first coding exon, and first intron of the TMEM33 gene. Many different transcription factors are known to bind to this region. The most likely to bind transcription factors are expressed most in connective tissue (i.e. blood, adipose tissue, and bone), the immune system, and nervous system.

== mRNA ==
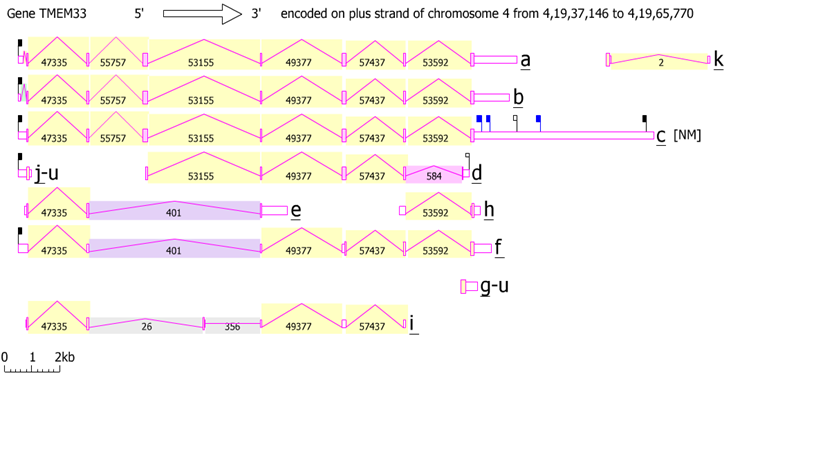
All eleven human transcripts of TMEM33 aligned. The transcripts a, b, c, d, and e encode viable TMEM33 isoforms and the other six do not.

Eleven different mRNA transcript variants of TMEM33 exist, 9 alternatively spliced variants and 2 unspliced forms. Only 5 variants (a, b, c, d, and e) encode proteins. Transcripts a, b, and c encode the same 247 amino acid long protein because each have the same 7 typical coding exons. These three variants only vary in 3' UTR length. Transcripts a, b, and c have a 744 base pair long coding range and a particularly long 3’ UTR that is 6000 base pairs long.

== Protein ==
=== Characteristics ===
SUSIO prediction of TMEM33 amino acid arrangement in human cellular membrane

In Homo sapiens, TMEM33 protein has 5 different coding mRNA variants that encode 3 different protein isoforms. The largest and most common human TMEM33 protein is 247 amino acid long protein with 3 transmembrane domains. The only known TMEM33 ortholog with four transmembrane domains is Tts1 in Schizosaccharomyces pombe. The human protein has a predicted molecular weight of 28 kDa and an isoelectric point of 9.88. TMEM33 has a significantly high net positive charge and quantity of hydrophobic residues. In particular, leucine that makes up 17.8% of the human TMEM33 protein. TMEM33 contains a conserved domain in the protein super family UPF0121, in Homo sapiens this region spans from amino acids 1 to 246.

=== Post-translation modifications ===
Programs and experiments that analyze proteins predict various post-translational modifications of TMEM33. There is an experimentally determined acetylation point is at alanine, amino acid residue 2 in humans. Human TMEM33 has phosphorylation predicted on serine residues 197 and 198 and threonine residues 5, 127, and 193. The primary kinases that are predicted to act on TMEM33 are Protein kinase C (PKC) and PKA. TMEM33 is predicted to have an O-glycosylation site at human amino acid residues 4 and 5

=== Structure ===
The exact secondary structure of TMEM33 is unknown, but it is predicted to be composed primarily of alpha-helices and coiled domains. The tertiary structure is unknown.

=== Cellular localization ===
According to the sequence motifs of the Homo Sapiens, TMEM33 it is predicted to be at the endoplasmic reticulum (ER) 48%, mitochondria 35%, and nucleus 13%. TMEM33 orthologs in vertebrates, invertebrates, and fungi were also predicted to localize to these three cellular locations: the ER first and the mitochondria second, and some orthologs a third location was predicted and it was the nucleus. Homo Sapiens TMEM33 localized with ER membrane and NE exogenously. The fission yeast TMEM33 ortholog, Tts1, was reported to localize to the ER and to the NE (nuclear envelope).

== Homology ==
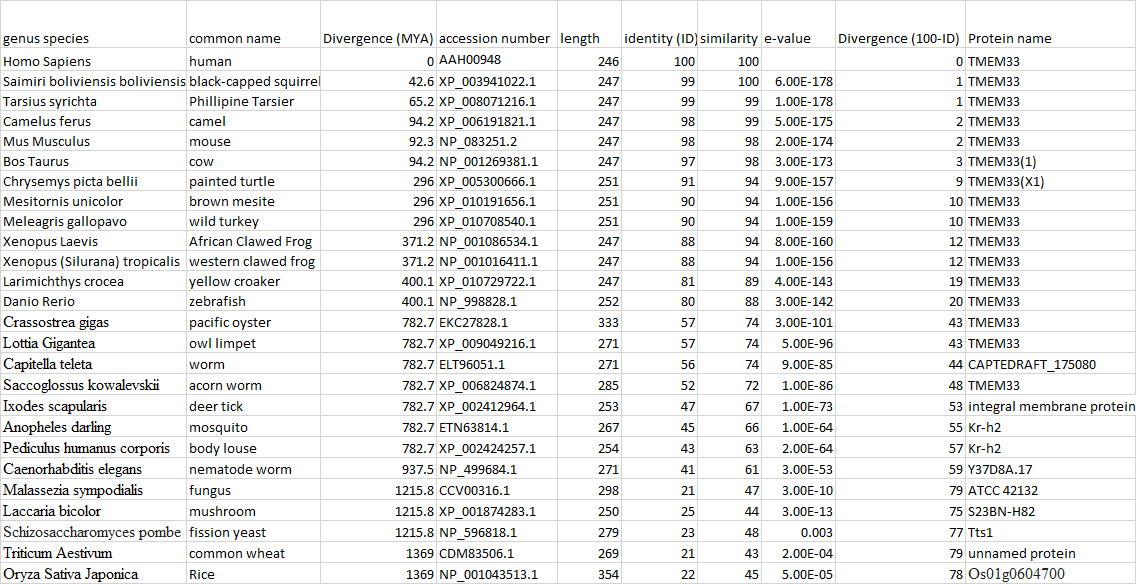
Orthologs of TMEM33 and their divergence from human TMEM33 as obtained from NCBI

A TMEM33 ortholog is known to be in over 150 organisms and no known paralogs exist.

TMEM33 is conserved throughout all animals, similarity to human TMEM33 is >80% for all vertebrates and >60% for all invertebrates. TMEM33 has very distant orthologs that have UPF0121 in fungus, yeast, and plants.

== Protein interactions ==
Using human proteins, an affinity chromatography ran on TMEM33 showed that the protein bound to reticulon 4C, 1A, 2B, 3C, and Arl6IP1 in vitro. TMEM33 was found to interact with ubiquitin C, ubiquitin specific peptidase 19 (USP19), 40S ribosomal protein S14 (RPS14), replication protein A (RPA1, RPA2, RPA3), transitional endoplasmic reticulum ATPase (VCP), and RNA polymerase III initiation factor (BRF2) using affinity capture experiments with those proteins as bait. Coimmunoprecipitation experiment found two-pore channel (TPC), an ion channel, and TMEM33 bind.

== Function ==
TMEM33 localizes to the endoplasmic reticulum (ER) membrane and the nuclear envelope, and therefore must function in these regions. TMEM33 exogenously suppresses reticulon 4C function, which is a protein that induces the formation of the tubular structure of the ER. Therefore, TMEM33 is thought to regulate tubular ER structure through modulation of reticulon activity. Tts1, TMEM33 ortholog in S. pombe, has been found to be involved in dictating ER curvature as well. In the nucleus, knock-out studies indicate Tts1 has a role in directing the spindle pole bodies and nuclear core complexes in the nuclear envelope during mitosis.
