= Anti-MAG peripheral neuropathy =

- Other names: Neuropathy associated with monoclonal IgM antibodies to myelin-associated glycoprotein
- Specialty: Immunology, neurology

Anti-MAG peripheral neuropathy is a specific type of peripheral neuropathy in which the person's own immune system attacks cells that are specific in maintaining a healthy nervous system. As these cells are destroyed by antibodies, the nerve cells in the surrounding region begin to lose function and create many problems in both sensory and motor function. Specifically, antibodies against myelin-associated glycoprotein (MAG) damage Schwann cells. While the disorder occurs in only 10% of those afflicted with peripheral neuropathy, people afflicted have symptoms such as muscle weakness, sensory problems, and other motor deficits usually starting in the form of a tremor of the hands or trouble walking. There are, however, multiple treatments that range from simple exercises in order to build strength to targeted drug treatments that have been shown to improve function in people with this type of peripheral neuropathy.

== Background ==
=== Myelination by Schwann cells ===
Myelin is an important part of neuron cells and provides insulation allowing the neuron's action potential to travel faster and more consistently. In order to provide insulation, multiple layers of closely opposing membrane are wrapped around the axon. By acting as an electrical insulator, the conduction ability of the axon is sped up considerably allowing action potentials to travel at a much faster rate, about fifteen times faster in certain cases. This ability allows the nervous system to send messages faster and more accurately. Disruption of the myelin sheath on cells that are normally myelinated allows leakage of action potential much like a faulty wire will allow leakage of electricity in a circuit. This slows the messages being sent along those nerves and disrupts normal function.

Schwann cells are the cells in the peripheral nervous system that create and maintain myelin sheaths on neurons. These are the glial cells of the peripheral nervous system and are located around the axons that they serve. Damage to these cells results in degeneration of the myelin sheath and inevitably lead to problems in communication for the nervous system.

=== Myelin-associated glycoprotein ===
Myelin-associated glycoprotein (MAG) is a glycoprotein in the membranes of Schwann cells, and oligodendrocytes which create myelin for nerve cells in the nervous system. Research through cloning of the rat MAG gene has shown that it is a type I transmembrane protein meaning that it contains domains both inside the cell membrane and outside the cell membrane. Expression of this glycoprotein is very specific to myelin-forming cells and begins very early in the myelination process in order to function in the early development of axons in the central nervous system. The expression continues to be relatively high even in mature animals, however, suggesting that it is associated with not only formation but maintenance as well.

Research through knockout mice, or mice with the MAG gene removed, has shown that this glycoprotein serves heavily in the formation of myelin but also show that early development of the peripheral nervous system is relatively normal even without the presence of MAG. The knockout mice generally show many motor deficits, however, as they age caused by the degeneration of the myelinated axons further suggesting the need for these glycoproteins in maintenance of the sheaths.

While it is still unclear as to the exact mechanism or pathway by which MAG affects myelination, studies suggest that MAG serves in a receptor role to begin a signaling cascade begun by activation from an external source. MAG has also been shown to bind as a ligand to a receptor on the axonal surface which suggests that the external stimulus activating the creation of myelin comes from the nerve cell or cells that these glycoproteins are bound to.

=== MAG antibodies ===
Antibodies are created by the body that can then attack and disrupt the function of myelin associated glycoproteins. These antibodies have been found to bind to the external domain of the glycoproteins and inhibit any other signaling to occur. As these proteins are important in various signal cascades that eventually lead to the Schwann cells creating myelin, these antibodies basically halt myelin creation leading to the neuropathy. There is still, however, much debate as to the actual cause for these antibodies to be created. There has been some research to suggest that these antibodies are linked to various forms of amyloidosis as patients with amyloidosis experience elevated anti-MAG antibodies usually leading to a form of neuropathy. This does not, however, provide any evidence as to the mechanisms behind the creation of the antibodies.

== Symptoms and signs ==
=== Common ===
People with this disease have shown many sensory and muscular symptoms. Most patients have a sensory ataxia, or sensory loss in various extremities, along with mild to moderate muscle weakness, usually starting in the toes and fingers and moving inward. Most patients also present a mild to moderate tremor in the extremities which increases as the disease progresses.

=== Severe ===
More severe symptoms occur after the disease progresses and there is much more damage to the myelin sheaths in the peripheral nervous system. These can present as debilitating tremors that prevent patients from doing normal tasks, complete sensory loss on limbs, and, in some cases, extensive muscle atrophy.

== Diagnosis ==
Detection of this type of neuropathy has concentrated mostly on detecting presence of antibodies because the antibodies are the main cause for the disease. Anti-MAG antibodies can be readily detected in a patient's sera using various types of assays, but mainly an ELISA has been shown to be most effective. There are also various biological indicators, such as elevated cerebral spinal fluid proteins and elevated IgM monoclonal levels. These can also be tested either by drawing serum from a patient or by drawing spinal fluid from a spinal tap and testing using an assay or blot.

== Treatments ==
Drug and therapeutic treatments exist in order to battle this disease; though many have proven ineffective.

=== Immunotherapy and chemotherapy ===
While immunotherapy works for some patients in relieving minor symptoms, overall most conventional therapies using steroids, immunosuppressants, chemotherapy, and intravenous immunoglobulin therapies have not helped most patients. This has created a need for newer and more novel therapies to be developed.

=== Chlorambucil and prednisone ===
Chlorambucil is a chemotherapy drug normally used to treat leukemia as it is often used as an immunosuppressant drug, and prednisone is a steroid that has also been found to be particularly effective as an immunosuppressant. This combination of drugs has minimal to no benefits in most patients, but a small number do see small improvements such as decreased tremors. This combination has not been very effective in more severe cases, though, and is not considered a long term therapy.

=== Cyclophosphamide ===
Cyclophosphamide is a drug often used in the treatment of lymphomas and works by slowing or stopping cell growth. It also works as an immunosuppressant by decreasing the body's immune response to various diseases and conditions. This drug has been found to make significant improvements in people with anti-MAG neuropathy by relieving sensory loss and helping to improve quality of life in a few short months. There is, however, a risk of cancer because of this treatment and is therefore not used on a regular basis.

=== Fludarabine ===
Fludarabine is a drug normally used to treat hematological malignancies and acts as an immunosuppressant. It has been shown to significantly improve conditions in neuropathy patients, but because of the lack of studies it is not used regularly. There is also a danger of potential toxicity as the treatment takes a year to stabilize the patient.

=== Intravenous immunoglobulin ===
Intravenous immunoglobulin is a blood product administered by IV. It is used to treat various immune deficiencies and autoimmune diseases. While this has been shown to be effective on various types of disorders, there have been no studies that show promise in this technique treating anti-MAG neuropathies.

=== Most promising drug: Rituximab ===
Rituximab is considered to be one of the most promising drugs in the treatment of anti-MAG peripheral neuropathy. This drug is an antibody against a protein which is primarily found on the surface of B cells which, when attached, destroys the B cells. This drug has been used as a treatment in many autoimmune diseases as well as lymphomas and transplant rejection. Because of its ability to suppress the immune system, it has been used to treat anti-MAG neuropathy in the hopes that it will destroy cells that would target necessary glycoproteins on the Schwann cells. Studies in patients has shown that most patients experience marked increase in sensory and motor abilities within the first few months of therapy. There are, however, long term studies that have shown that treatment with rituximab can create many immune problems. As with most immunosuppressant drugs, there is a risk of other infections and diseases that are normally easily fought off by the immune system will be allowed take a foothold. Studies have shown that after long term treatment, patients experience many of these problems as well as a decline in their neuropathy. This has led to further studies being conducted on the drug's safety profile and overall effectiveness as a treatment.

Unfortunately, more recent studies have concluded that "rituximab is ineffective in improving ISS in patients with IgM anti-MAG demyelinating neuropathy."

== Current research ==
Current research has focused mostly on determining treatment options. This has been studied through clinical trials with drugs listed previously or through new therapy techniques that delay loss in function. Most drugs being studied are immunosuppressants that can attack the antibodies or other aspects in the hope of preventing damage to the Schwann cells. This will, ideally, prevent the loss of myelination on peripheral nerve fibers.
