= BIIB033 =

Monoclonal antibody

Monoclonal antibody
- Type: ?

Clinical data
- Other names: Anti-LINGO-1

Legal status
- Legal status: Investigational

Identifiers
- CAS Number: 1884474-47-8

BIIB033 (also known as Anti-LINGO-1) is a monoclonal antibody targeting LINGO1. As of 2015 it was being developed by Biogen as a treatment for diseases such as multiple sclerosis and optic neuritis.

== See also ==
- Ocrelizumab
