= Myelin-associated glycoprotein =

Protein-coding gene in the species Homo sapiens

MAG

Identifiers
- Aliases: MAG, GMA, S-SIGLEC-4A, SIGLEC4A, SPG75, myelin associated glycoprotein
- External IDs: OMIM: 159460; MGI: 96912; GeneCards: MAG

Gene location (Human)
Chr.	Chromosome 19 (human)
Band	19q13.12	Start	35,292,125 bp
Band	19q13.12	End	35,313,807 bp

Gene location (Mouse)
Chr.	Chromosome 7 (mouse)
Band	7 B1|7 19.26 cM	Start	30,598,601 bp
Band	7 B1|7 19.26 cM	End	30,614,298 bp
RNA expression pattern
Bgee	Human / Mouse (ortholog); Top expressed in: C1 segment; inferior ganglion of vagus nerve; middle frontal gyrus; corpus callosum; pons; superior vestibular nucleus; subthalamic nucleus; external globus pallidus; ventral tegmental area; pars reticulata / Top expressed in: deep cerebellar nuclei; pontine nuclei; lateral geniculate nucleus; globus pallidus; lumbar subsegment of spinal cord; dorsal tegmental nucleus; ventral tegmental area; central gray substance of midbrain; medulla oblongata; medial geniculate nucleus; More reference expression data
BioGPS	n/a
Gene ontology
Molecular function	signaling receptor binding; lipid binding; protein kinase binding; carbohydrate binding; sialic acid binding; protein homodimerization activity; ganglioside GT1b binding
Cellular component	cytoplasm; plasma membrane; integral component of plasma membrane; membrane; integral component of membrane; paranode region of axon; myelin sheath adaxonal region; myelin sheath; compact myelin; Schmidt-Lanterman incisure; membrane raft; mesaxon
Biological process	cell adhesion; nervous system development; negative regulation of neuron projection development; substantia nigra development; central nervous system myelination; negative regulation of axon extension; positive regulation of myelination; negative regulation of neuron apoptotic process; negative regulation of neuron differentiation; positive regulation of astrocyte differentiation; negative regulation of axonogenesis; leukocyte migration; cellular response to mechanical stimulus; cell-cell adhesion via plasma-membrane adhesion molecules; transmission of nerve impulse; axon regeneration
Sources:Amigo / QuickGO
Orthologs
Databases	NCBI: entry; OMA: entry
Species	Human	Mouse
Entrez	4099	17136
Ensembl	ENSG00000105695	ENSMUSG00000036634
UniProt	P20916	P20917
RefSeq (mRNA)	NM_080600; NM_001199216; NM_002361	NM_010758; NM_001346084; NM_001346085; NM_001346086; NM_001346087 NM_001346088; NM_001346089; NM_001369262
RefSeq (protein)	NP_001186145; NP_002352; NP_542167	NP_001333013; NP_001333014; NP_001333015; NP_001333016; NP_001333017 NP_001333018; NP_034888; NP_001356191
Location (UCSC)	Chr 19: 35.29 – 35.31 Mb	Chr 7: 30.6 – 30.61 Mb
PubMed search
- Wikidata
View/Edit Human	View/Edit Mouse

Myelin-associated glycoprotein (MAG), or Siglec-4 is a type 1 transmembrane protein, a glycoprotein localized in periaxonal Schwann cell and oligodendrocyte membranes, where it plays a role in glial-axonal interactions. MAG is a member of the SIGLEC family of proteins and is a functional ligand of the NOGO-66 receptor, NgR. MAG is believed to be involved in myelination during remyelination (nerve regeneration) in the peripheral nervous system (PNS) and is vital for the long-term survival of the myelinated axons following myelinogenesis. In the CNS MAG is one of three main myelin-associated inhibitors of axonal regeneration after injury, making it an important protein for future research on neurogenesis in the CNS.

== Structure ==
MAG is a 100 kDA glycoprotein. Uncleaved MAG is a complete transmembrane form, which acts as a signaling and adhesion molecule. MAG can also act as a signaling molecule as a soluble protein after it has been proteolytically shed. This form of the protein is called dMAG.

=== Adhesion ===
MAG has an extended conformation of five immunoglobulin (Ig) domains and a homodimeric arrangement involving membrane-proximal domains Ig4 and Ig5. MAG-oligosaccharide complex structures and biophysical assays show how MAG engages axonal gangliosides at domain Ig1.

== Function ==
=== Myelin-axon interactions ===
MAG is a critical protein in the formation and maintenance of myelin sheaths. MAG is localized on the inner membrane of the myelin sheath and interacts with axonal membrane proteins to attach the myelin sheath to the axon. Mutations to the MAG gene are implicated in demyelination diseases such as multiple sclerosis.

=== Inhibition of nerve regeneration ===
Axons in the central nervous system do not regenerate after injury the same way that axons in the peripheral nervous system do. The mechanism responsible for inhibited neuroregeneration is regulated by three main proteins, one of which is MAG. The exact mechanism through which MAG inhibits neuroregeneration appears to be through binding of NgR. This receptor is also bound by Nogo protein, suggesting that the mechanism of myelin-associated inhibition of axon regeneration through NgR the has redundant ligands, furthering the inhibition. MAG binds with high affinity to NgR, suggesting that it is equally as responsible for inhibition of axon regeneration as Nogo.

=== Rho kinase pathway ===
Once MAG (or Nogo) has bound to NgR, NgR activates the rho kinase (ROCK) pathway. The activation of the rho kinase pathway leads to the phosphorylation of proteins which inhibit neurite outgrowth.

== See also ==
- Myelin
- Myelinogenesis
- NgR
- Myelin oligodendrocyte glycoprotein
- Anti-MAG peripheral neuropathy
