= Sandra Wolin =

American microbiologist and physician-scientist

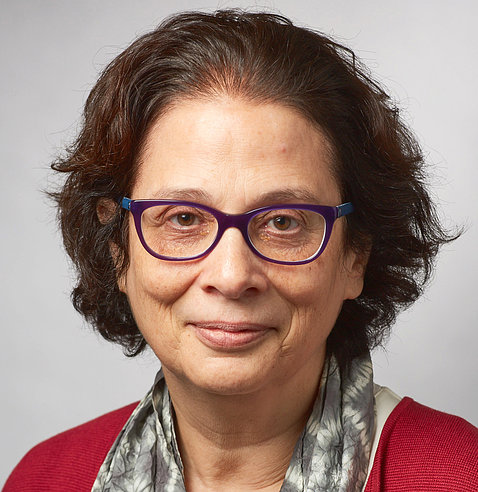
- Wolin in 2016
- Born: Sandra Lynn Wolin
- Education: Princeton University (BA); Yale University (MD, PhD)
- Scientific career
- Fields: Molecular biology, biomedical research
- Workplaces: Yale School of Medicine; National Cancer Institute
- Thesis: The Ro Small Cytoplasmic Ribonucleoproteins of Mammalian Cells (1985)
- Doctoral advisor: Joan A. Steitz
- Other academic advisors: Peter Walter

Sandra Lynn Wolin is an American molecular biologist and physician-scientist specialized in biogenesis, function, and turnover of non-coding RNA. She is chief of the RNA Biology Laboratory at the National Cancer Institute.

== Education ==
Wolin completed an A.B. in Biochemical Sciences from Princeton University. She earned a M.D. from the Yale School of Medicine and a Ph.D. degree from the department of molecular biophysics and biochemistry at Yale University. Her 1985 dissertation was titled, The Ro Small Cytoplasmic Ribonucleoproteins of Mammalian Cells. Wolin's doctoral advisor was Joan A. Steitz. She carried out postdoctoral training with Peter Walter at the University of California, San Francisco, where she devised an early ribosome profiling method.

== Career ==
Wolin returned to the Yale School of Medicine as an assistant professor, and rose to the rank of professor in the departments of cell biology and molecular biophysics and biochemistry. From 2014-2017, she served as director of the Yale Center for RNA Science and Medicine. She joined the National Cancer Institute (NCI) in 2017 as chief of the newly formed RNA Biology Laboratory. She heads the section on non-coding RNAs and ribonucleoprotein particles (RNPs).

=== Research ===
Wolin's research examines how noncoding RNAs function, how cells recognize and degrade defective RNAs and how failure to degrade these RNAs affects cell function and contributes to human disease. Wolin studies the biogenesis, function, and turnover of non-coding RNAs. Her laboratory has identified proteins that recognize misfolded and otherwise defective RNAs. By studying a bacterial ortholog of one such protein, the ring-shaped Ro60 autoantigen, they discovered that this protein is tethered by noncoding "Y RNA" to a ring-shaped nuclease, forming a double-ringed ribonucleoprotein machine specialized for structured RNA degradation. The laboratory is characterizing this new RNA degradation machine, identifying additional roles for Ro60 and Y RNA in both human cells and bacteria, and uncovering other pathways by which defective and damaged RNAs are recognized and degraded.

== Awards and honors ==
Wollin is an elected fellow of the American Association for the Advancement of Science, the American Academy of Microbiology, the American Academy of Arts and Sciences, and the National Academy of Sciences.

== Selected works ==
- Wolin, S. L.; Steitz, J. A. (April 1984). "The Ro small cytoplasmic ribonucleoproteins: identification of the antigenic protein and its binding site on the Ro RNAs". Proceedings of the National Academy of Sciences. 81 (7): 1996–2000. Bibcode:1984PNAS...81.1996W. doi:10.1073/pnas.81.7.1996. ISSN 0027-8424. PMC 345423. PMID 6201849.
- Wolin, S. L.; Walter, P. (November 1988). "Ribosome pausing and stacking during translation of a eukaryotic mRNA". The EMBO Journal. 7 (11): 3559–3569. doi:10.1002/j.1460-2075.1988.tb03233.x. PMC 454858. PMID 2850168.
- Wolin, Sandra L.; Cedervall, Tommy (June 2002). "The La Protein". Annual Review of Biochemistry. 71 (1): 375–403. doi:10.1146/annurev.biochem.71.090501.150003. ISSN 0066-4154. PMID 12045101.
