= Reticulon =

Reticulons (RTNs in vertebrates and reticulon-like proteins or RNTls in other eukaryotes) are a group of evolutionary conservative proteins residing predominantly in endoplasmic reticulum, primarily playing a role in promoting membrane curvature. In addition, reticulons may play a role in nuclear pore complex formation, vesicle formation, and other processes yet to be defined. They have also been linked to oligodendrocyte roles in inhibition of neurite outgrowth. Some studies link RTNs with Alzheimer's disease and amyotrophic lateral sclerosis.

All eukaryotes studied so far carry RTN genes in their genomes. The reticulons are absent only in archaea and bacteria. Mammals have four reticulon genes, RTN1, RTN2, RTN3, RTN4. Plants possess a greater number of reticulon isoforms, with 21 having been identified in the commonly used model organism Arabidopsis thaliana.

The genes possess a number of exons and introns and are accordingly spliced into many isoforms. C-terminal region of RTNs contains a highly conservative reticulon homology domain (RHD) while other parts of the protein may vary even within a single organism.

A peculiar feature of RTN4's isoform RTN4A (Nogo-A) is its ability to inhibit axonal growth. This reticulon subform is absent in fish, a taxon known for the heightened ability of its CNS to regenerate after injury.

Transmembrane 33 (TMEM33) exogenously suppresses reticulon 4C function and therefore may play a role in dictating membrane curvature through inhibition of reticulon function.

== Structure ==
=== Evolutionary history ===
Reticulon proteins, which range from 200-1,200 amino acids, have been tracked in all eukaryotic organisms that have been examined. The family of vertebrate proteins are called reticulons, and all other located eukaryotes are called reticulon-like proteins. Some examples of explored reticulon genomes of eukaryotes are in Homo sapiens, Mus musculus, Danio rerio, Drosophila melanogaster, Arabidopsis thaliana, and Saccharomyces cerevisiae. These genomes are not found in either archaea or bacteria. Because of their absence from prokaryotes and close association with the endoplasmic reticulum (ER), it is proposed that reticulons have evolved with the eukaryotic endomembrane system. In mammals, there are four reticulon genes: RTN_{1-4}. RTN 3 and 4 have sequence identity more closely related at 73% than between 2 and 4 with only a 52% sequence identity. There is a divergence in sequence between reticulons as their splice isoforms can be variable, even in the same organism. This is consistent with the evolution of species and cell-specific roles for reticulons. The longest isoform, Nogo-A, has shown through studies that it can inhibit neurite outgrowth and regeneration. However, this isoform is absent in fish where regeneration of central nervous system is extensive. Reticulons can vary in function between species.

=== Reticulon protein structure ===
The reticulon family contain a carboxy-terminal reticulon homology domain (RHD) that has two hydrophobic regions of 28-36 amino acids. Those regions are supposedly embedded in the membrane. Those regions are separated by the 60-70 amino acids of the hydrophilic loop. Following the loop is a carboxy-terminal tail which has a length of about 50 amino acids. The amino-terminal domains are not similar to reticulons within the family. However, the three-dimensional structure has been preserved from yeasts to plants to humans. The hydrophobic region of the structure is abnormally long compared to other transmembrane domains. The structure of the reticulon may be related to the function of this protein.

=== Localization in ER, N- and C-terminal ends ===
Reticulons are typically in the ER of cells; however, they have additionally been found on cell surfaces in mammals and on the surface of oligodendrocytes where they inhibit axon growth. The N-terminal, loop region and C-terminal are all on the cytosol side of the ER membrane and they are able to interact with other cytosolic proteins. N-terminal regions in reticulon proteins are diversified in interacting with other substrates.

Overall, three models have been identified of RHD topology. One finding suggests that the amino-acid terminus and the 66-loop extend into the extracellular space. This would indicate that the hydrophobic region double-backs on itself in the membrane. Other data suggests that the amino-terminal is intracellular. Lastly, a third model explains the 66-loop and amino-terminal domain are cytoplasmic. All of these models suggest that reticulons may have different topologies at different regions such as the ER and plasma membrane. This would allow them to not only look different at each location, but be able to carry different roles in the cell and in different cell types.

The first reticulon protein RTN_{1} was characterized as an antigen for neuroendocrine cells from a cDNA in neural tissue. It was later renamed when it was proved to be associated with the ER from several different methods. Reticulons do not have an ER localization sequence, but the RHD hydrophobic region is able to target protein-RTN to the ER by green fluorescence. Without the RHD, there is no association with the ER. Reticulons have localized to the ER in the following organisms: yeast, Arabidopsis, Xenopus, Drosophila and mammals.

== Function ==
=== Mechanisms ===
Evidence shows that reticulons influence ER and Golgi-body trafficking in and out of the cell through plasma membrane-associated proteins. Reticulons additionally aid in the formation of vesicles and membrane morphogenesis. When inhibiting RTN_{4}A in mammalian cells, it does not allow for proper formation of membrane tubules. In C. elegans, removing RTNL RET_{−1} and associated proteins interferes with the formation of the ER during mitosis. It also disrupts nuclear envelope reassembly. Reticulons have been found to interact with proteins that are involved with vesicular formation and morphogenesis of the ER. They are additionally involved in intracellular trafficking. In one example, it was shown that increasing expression of RTN_{3} keeps transport of proteins from retrograding from the Golgi bodies to the ER. Additionally, reticulons may be used to shape coated protein vesicles by interacting with a component of the adaptor protein complex (which maintains the coat on the vesicle). Reticulons may also be involved with apoptosis. The RTN_{1}C inhibits Bcl-X_{L}, which is an inhibitor of apoptosis. RTN_{1}C has also been shown in the ER to upregulate its sensitivity to stressors, which is able to modulate apoptosis.

Reticulons have also been linked with oligodendrocyte roles in inhibition of neurite outgrowth. The longest isoform of RTN_{4} has been studied extensively to show that this protein (Nogo-A) was identified as an inhibitor of neurite outgrowth. More specifically, the 66-loop region (Nogo66) is a potent inhibitor of neurite growth. Many studies in animals have found that inhibition of a NogoA interaction has promoted axon growth and recovery after a spinal cord injury. Subsequently, clinical trials of anti-Nogo antibodies have begun to see if we can use this phenomenon in humans.

There is increasing evidence that reticulons are involved with several different types of neurodegenerative diseases such as Alzheimer's disease and amyotrophic lateral sclerosis. In Alzheimer’s disease, a specific enzyme produces a pathological agent. Reticulons can interfere with those enzymes by decreasing Aβ levels. It was found in the temporal lobes of humans that RTN_{3} was depleted in Alzheimer’s patients. Nonetheless, the exact relationship between Alzheimer’s disease and reticulons is unknown. There may also be a link of reticulons to multiple sclerosis and hereditary spastic paraplegia. The serum of patients with multiple sclerosis contains autoantibodies against the isoform A-specific region of RTN4. In the most common mutated protein in hereditary spastic paraplegia, spastin, there was an interaction with both RTN1 and RTN3 through two-hybrid screening. Lastly, reticulons can be associated with amyotrophic lateral sclerosis (ALS). In a mouse model, varied regulation of RTN_{4}A was found. In muscle biopsies of rats, the levels of RTN4 were related to the severity of the disease. Additionally, ALS could be predicted with increased expression of RTN_{4}A in lower motor neuron syndromes.

=== Reticulons in plants ===
Knowledge of the reticulon is more advanced in yeasts and animals than plants. Most of what we know for plants can be derived from research from the latter, with little research on plants alone. The localization of some RTNs has been recognized in the tubules of plant cells forming the ER. However, research shows that the reticulons are restricted to the edges of the ER cisternae. Scientists have inferred that reticulons have a role in assembling the nuclear envelope during cell division. Current research includes the search for Nogo-66 protein homologs in plants. There is also hope to determine the RHD domain receptor in plants.

==== Reticulon-like proteins: Arabidopsis ====
Due to the lack of information of reticulons, scientists often study reticulon-like proteins. The genome Arabidopsis thaliana has at least 19 reticulon like proteins, and 15 of them have been explicitly identified. One study on Arabidopsis looks at transport between organelles and specific receptors. The regulation of receptor transport to the plasma membrane is important for the recognition of pathogens. Membrane associated proteins travel from the ER to the Golgi bodies, and eventually the plasma membrane. Immune receptors that are related to the plasma membrane are called pattern recognition receptors (PRRs). Through Arabidopsis protein microarrays the FLAGELIN-SENSITIVE2 (FLS2) receptor, a PRR, was tagged to identify reticulon-like protein RTNLB1 and its homolog RTNLB2. When manipulating the expression levels of RTNLB1 and RTNLB2, signaling of the FLS2 receptor was interrupted. A serine cluster at the N-terminal of the protein is important for the FLS2 interaction. Although there is not a direct interference, RTNLB1 and RTNLB2 interact with newly created FLS2 to facilitate transport to the plasma membrane. Through the RTNLB1 and RTNLB2 reticulon domain, their function is part of a larger protein system that moderates FLS2 secretion. Receptor trafficking is looked at through plant studies as an important process of receptor activity. The role of human reticulons which are involved in intracellular protein trafficking indicate the relationship between reticulons and plant RTNLBs.

One way those proteins can be compared to reticulons is in looking at reticulon-depleted yeast cells. Fluorescence was detected in modified ER structures of those yeast cells and the localization of the FLS2 was defected.

In another study, members of the RTN family of the Arabidopsis thaliana (RTNLB13) were cloned. Those members were expressed in tobacco leaf epidermal cells with an attached yellow fluorescent protein (YFP). The RTNLB13 was localized in the ER of those cells. Additionally, an ER luminal marker was tagged to further show that when RTNLB13 was added, morphological changes existed in the lumen of the ER. Fluorescence recovery after photobleaching (FRAP) analysis has shown that increased expression of RTNLB13 decreases the likeliness of proteins to be soluble in the ER lumen. To further examine that location of RTNS are the ER, the increased expression of RTNLB13 did not have an effect on the Golgi shape and secretion of a reporter protein.
