= RTN1 =

Protein-coding gene in the species Homo sapiens

Identifiers
- Aliases: RTN1, NSP, reticulon 1
- External IDs: OMIM: 600865; MGI: 1933947; GeneCards: RTN1

Gene location (Human)
Chr.	Chromosome 14 (human)
Band	14q23.1	Start	59,595,976 bp
Band	14q23.1	End	59,870,776 bp

Gene location (Mouse)
Chr.	Chromosome 12 (mouse)
Band	12|12 C3	Start	72,258,526 bp
Band	12|12 C3	End	72,455,828 bp
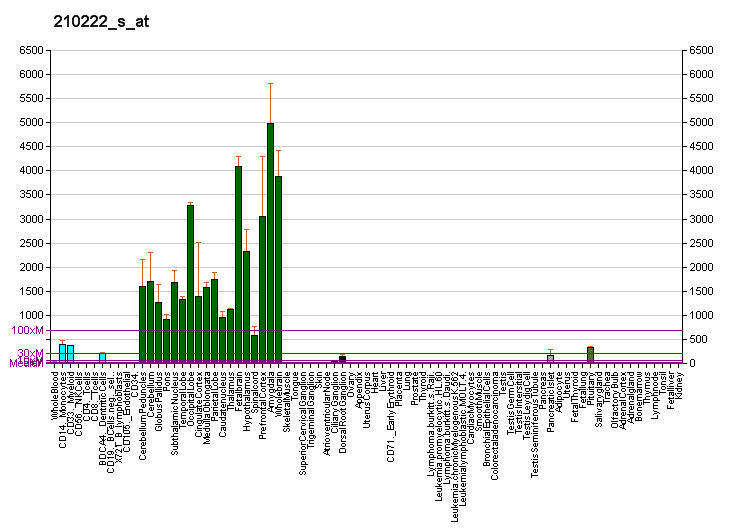

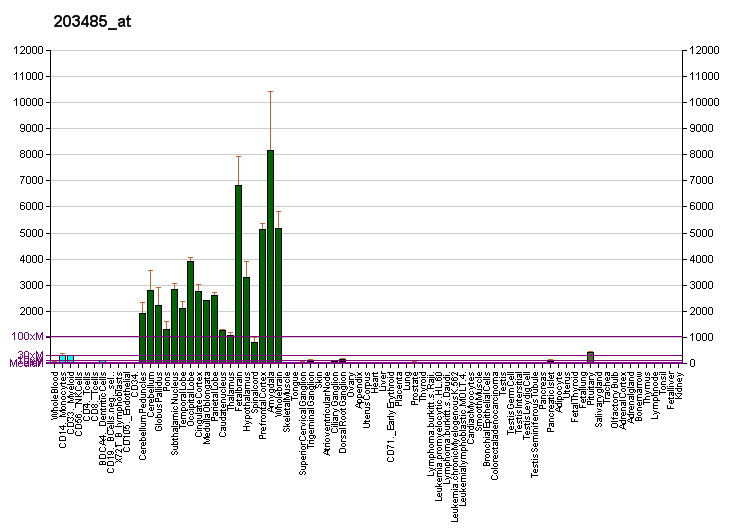
RNA expression pattern
Bgee	Human / Mouse (ortholog); Top expressed in: Brodmann area 23; endothelial cell; pons; orbitofrontal cortex; cerebellar vermis; middle temporal gyrus; superior frontal gyrus; occipital lobe; pars compacta; parietal lobe / Top expressed in: dentate gyrus of hippocampal formation granule cell; perirhinal cortex; entorhinal cortex; CA3 field; superior frontal gyrus; central gray substance of midbrain; subiculum; nucleus of stria terminalis; primary visual cortex; cingulate gyrus; More reference expression data
BioGPS	More reference expression data
Gene ontology
Molecular function	protein binding
Cellular component	integral component of membrane; integral component of endoplasmic reticulum membrane; endoplasmic reticulum membrane; membrane; endoplasmic reticulum; Golgi membrane; Golgi apparatus
Biological process	neuron differentiation
Sources:Amigo / QuickGO
Orthologs
Databases	NCBI: entry; OMA: entry
Species	Human	Mouse
Entrez	6252	104001
Ensembl	ENSG00000139970	ENSMUSG00000021087
UniProt	Q16799	Q8K0T0
RefSeq (mRNA)	NM_001243115; NM_021136; NM_206852; NM_206857; NM_001363702	NM_001007596; NM_001286448; NM_153457
RefSeq (protein)	NP_066959; NP_996734; NP_001350631	NP_001007597; NP_001273377; NP_703187
Location (UCSC)	Chr 14: 59.6 – 59.87 Mb	Chr 12: 72.26 – 72.46 Mb
PubMed search
- Wikidata
View/Edit Human	View/Edit Mouse

Reticulon-1 also known as neuroendocrine-specific protein (NSP) is a protein that in humans is encoded by the RTN1 gene.

This gene belongs to the family of reticulon-encoding genes. Reticulons are associated with the endoplasmic reticulum, and are involved in neuroendocrine secretion or in membrane trafficking in neuroendocrine cells. Alternatively spliced transcript variants encoding different isoforms have been identified. Multiple promoters rather than alternative splicing of internal exons seem to be involved in this diversity.

== Interactions ==
RTN1 has been shown to interact with BCL2-like 1 and UGCG.
