= RTN2 =

Protein-coding gene in the species Homo sapiens

Identifiers
- Aliases: RTN2, NSP2, NSPL1, NSPLI, SPG12, reticulon 2
- External IDs: OMIM: 603183; MGI: 107612; GeneCards: RTN2

Gene location (Human)
Chr.	Chromosome 19 (human)
Band	19q13.32	Start	45,485,294 bp
Band	19q13.32	End	45,497,055 bp

Gene location (Mouse)
Chr.	Chromosome 7 (mouse)
Band	7 A3|7 9.54 cM	Start	19,016,549 bp
Band	7 A3|7 9.54 cM	End	19,030,085 bp
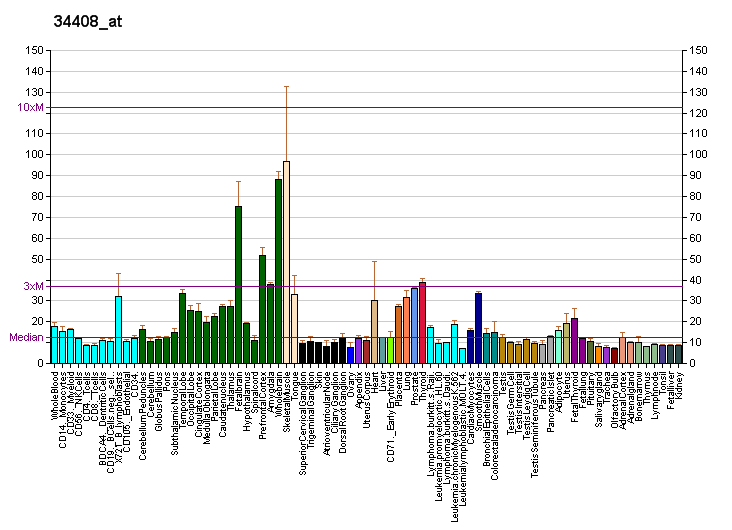

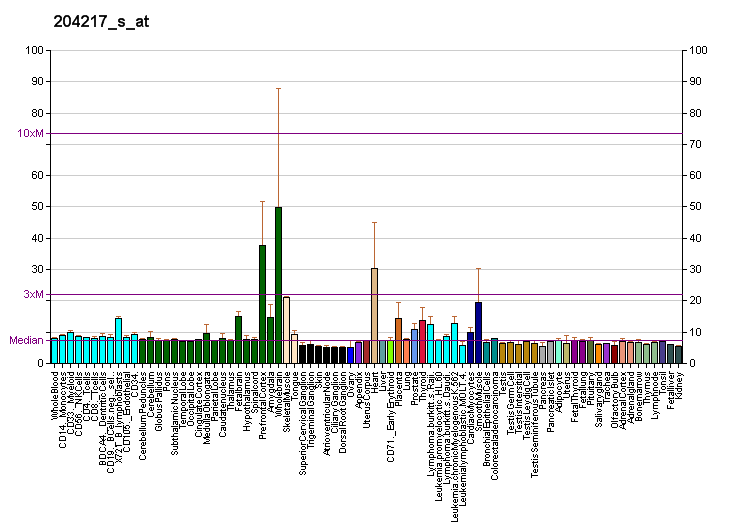
RNA expression pattern
Bgee	Human / Mouse (ortholog); Top expressed in: Skeletal muscle tissue of rectus abdominis; muscle of thigh; gastrocnemius muscle; vastus lateralis muscle; thoracic diaphragm; triceps brachii muscle; biceps brachii; glutes; body of tongue; Skeletal muscle tissue of biceps brachii / Top expressed in: triceps brachii muscle; muscle of thigh; temporal muscle; sternocleidomastoid muscle; ankle; digastric muscle; extensor digitorum longus muscle; vastus lateralis muscle; medial head of gastrocnemius muscle; tibialis anterior muscle; More reference expression data
BioGPS	More reference expression data
Gene ontology
Molecular function	protein binding
Cellular component	integral component of membrane; T-tubule; integral component of endoplasmic reticulum membrane; endoplasmic reticulum membrane; endoplasmic reticulum; membrane; terminal cisterna
Biological process	intracellular protein transmembrane transport; regulation of glucose import
Sources:Amigo / QuickGO
Orthologs
Databases	NCBI: entry; OMA: entry
Species	Human	Mouse
Entrez	6253	20167
Ensembl	ENSG00000125744	ENSMUSG00000030401
UniProt	O75298; Q96CG9	O70622
RefSeq (mRNA)	NM_206902; NM_005619; NM_206900; NM_206901	NM_001025364; NM_013648
RefSeq (protein)	NP_005610; NP_996783; NP_996784	NP_001020535; NP_038676
Location (UCSC)	Chr 19: 45.49 – 45.5 Mb	Chr 7: 19.02 – 19.03 Mb
PubMed search
- Wikidata
View/Edit Human	View/Edit Mouse

Reticulon-2 is a protein that in humans is encoded by the RTN2 gene.

This gene belongs to the family of reticulon encoding genes. Reticulons are associated with the endoplasmic reticulum, and are involved in neuroendocrine secretion or in membrane trafficking in neuroendocrine cells. Alternatively spliced transcript variants encoding different isoforms have been identified.
