= Reticulon 4 receptor =

Protein-coding gene in the species Homo sapiens

RTN4R
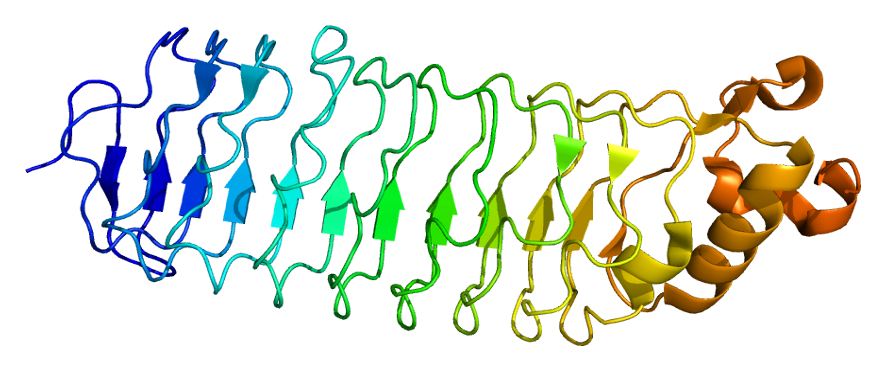

Identifiers
- Aliases: RTN4R, NGR, NOGOR, Reticulon 4 receptor
- External IDs: OMIM: 605566; MGI: 2136886; GeneCards: RTN4R
Available structures
PDB	Ortholog search: PDBe RCSB
PDB	List of PDB id codes 1OZN, 1P8T

Gene location (Human)
Chr.	Chromosome 22 (human)
Band	22q11.21	Start	20,241,415 bp
Band	22q11.21	End	20,283,246 bp

Gene location (Mouse)
Chr.	Chromosome 16 (mouse)
Band	16|16 A3	Start	17,945,506 bp
Band	16|16 A3	End	17,970,272 bp
RNA expression pattern
Bgee	Human / Mouse (ortholog); Top expressed in: right hemisphere of cerebellum; testicle; right frontal lobe; Brodmann area 9; prefrontal cortex; cingulate gyrus; anterior cingulate cortex; cerebellar vermis; amygdala; primary visual cortex / Top expressed in: primary visual cortex; hippocampus proper; Cortex of frontal lobe; superior frontal gyrus; dentate gyrus of hippocampal formation granule cell; Anterior olfactory nucleus; layer of neocortex; cerebellar cortex; secondary oocyte; multiform layer of neocortex; More reference expression data
BioGPS	n/a
Gene ontology
Molecular function	neuregulin receptor activity; protein kinase inhibitor activity; protein binding; heparin binding; chondroitin sulfate binding; ganglioside GM1 binding; ganglioside GT1b binding; lipid binding; signaling receptor activity; protein-containing complex binding
Cellular component	cytoplasm; membrane; growth cone; plasma membrane; axonal growth cone; integral component of plasma membrane; soma; endoplasmic reticulum; anchored component of membrane; neuron projection; extracellular exosome; cell surface; anchored component of external side of plasma membrane; dendritic shaft; membrane raft; axon; dendrite; cell projection; perikaryon; presynapse; glutamatergic synapse
Biological process	negative regulation of protein kinase activity; cytokine-mediated signaling pathway; neuronal signal transduction; positive regulation of GTPase activity; negative regulation of axonogenesis; negative regulation of axon extension; negative regulation of receptor signaling pathway via JAK-STAT; negative regulation of neuron projection development; negative regulation of axon regeneration; cell surface receptor signaling pathway; axonogenesis; corpus callosum development; positive regulation of Rho protein signal transduction
Sources:Amigo / QuickGO
Orthologs
Databases	NCBI: entry; OMA: entry
Species	Human	Mouse
Entrez	65078	65079
Ensembl	ENSG00000040608	ENSMUSG00000043811
UniProt	Q9BZR6	Q99PI8
RefSeq (mRNA)	NM_023004	NM_022982
RefSeq (protein)	NP_075380	NP_075358
Location (UCSC)	Chr 22: 20.24 – 20.28 Mb	Chr 16: 17.95 – 17.97 Mb
PubMed search
- Wikidata
View/Edit Human	View/Edit Mouse

Reticulon 4 receptor (RTN4R) also known as Nogo-66 Receptor (NgR) or Nogo receptor 1 is a protein which in humans is encoded by the RTN4R gene. This gene encodes the receptor for reticulon 4, oligodendrocytemyelin glycoprotein and myelin-associated glycoprotein. This receptor mediates axonal growth inhibition and may play a role in regulating axonal regeneration and plasticity in the adult central nervous system.

== Function ==
The Nogo-66 Receptor (NgR) is a high affinity binding receptor for a region of Nogo, a myelin associated protein that inhibits axon outgrowth. NgR was identified by Strittmatter and colleagues using an expression cloning strategy.

NgR is implicated in neuronal plasticity and regeneration. Its relative importance in mediating myelin inhibition in vitro and in vivo is currently under intense investigation, since this protein might be a good drug target for treatment of various neurological conditions such as spinal cord injury and stroke.

== Nogo pathway: rho kinase ==
While the entire pathway is not fully understood, the relationship between NgR and neuronal outgrowth has been fleshed out. NgR is a membrane protein that, when bound to neurite outgrowth inhibitor (Nogo), inhibits cell growth through the activation of rho kinase (ROCK).

=== NgR activation of p75 ===
It was known that NgR, Nogo, and another membrane receptor called p75 were involved in inhibiting neurite outgrowth. Through a variety of experimental procedures Wang et al. were able to identify the biochemical relationship between NgR and p75. First, it was observed that when p75 was knocked out in mice, outgrowth inhibition was no longer seen. Completing binding assays and co-immunoprecipitations revealed that p75 and NgR were not bound to each other through the cellular membrane. Mutating either p75 or NgR, however, resulted in truncated protein that would help reveal the binding interactions. When the extracellular domains of the receptors were removed no outgrowth inhibition was seen. This would suggest that the receptors interact extracellularly. Furthermore, it was reaffirmed that Nogo and myelin-associated gylcoprotein (MAG) bind NgR and not p75. The receptor p75 lacks a binding domain for either of these proteins.

=== Activation of rho protein ===
The work of Kaplan and Miller shows that there is an interaction between the p75/NgR receptors and Rho GDP dissociation inhibitor (Rho-GDI). Kaplan and Miller show that when Nogo is bound to NgR, Rho-GDI is associated with p75. When Rho-GDI is drawn to p75 it is no longer bound to Rho-GDP. This allows for GTP to be exchanged for GDP activating the Rho protein. Rho-GTP, a Rho GTPase, then activates ROCK which phosphorylates other proteins which inhibit neurite outgrowth. When Nogo is not bound to NgR, p75 is not activated and Rho-GDI remains bound to Rho-GDP. The Rho protein remains bound with GDP and remains inactive. ROCK therefore does not become activated and cannot change transcription patterns to inhibit neuronal outgrowth.

== Therapeutic inhibition ==
It is reasonable that inhibition of the above mechanism could aid the recovery of those suffering from spinal cord injuries. One such therapy is currently in clinical trials. The drug, called Cethrin, is produced by a group called Alseres. Cethrin is a ROCK inhibitor and therefore acts in the above pathway to prevent the activation of ROCK so neurite outgrowth can occur. Cethrin is applied as a paste to the site of injury during decompression surgery.

== Regulation of visual cortex plasticity ==
The Nogo-66 receptor (NgR) limits experience-driven visual cortex plasticity. In mutant mice, non-functional NgR resulted in enhancement of visual cortex plasticity after the critical period into adulthood, such that adult plasticity in the mutant mice resembled normal visual plasticity in juvenile mice brains. This function of NgR is of particular interest to the study of visual disorders that may result from imbalanced input during the critical period, such as amblyopia.

== See also ==
- Reticulon 4
