= Reticulon 4 =

Protein-coding gene in humans

RTN4
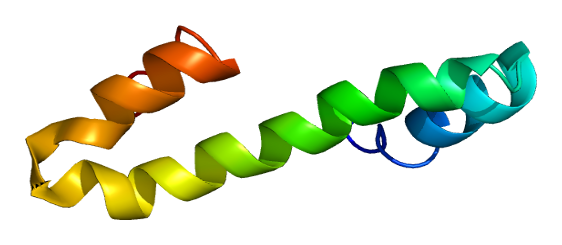

Identifiers
- Aliases: RTN4, ASY, NI220/250, NOGO, NOGO-A, NOGOC, NSP, NSP-CL, Nbla00271, Nbla10545, Nogo-B, Nogo-C, RTN-X, RTN4-A, RTN4-B1, RTN4-B2, RTN4-C, Reticulon 4
- External IDs: OMIM: 604475; MGI: 1915835; GeneCards: RTN4
Available structures
PDB	Ortholog search: PDBe RCSB
PDB	List of PDB id codes 2G31, 2JV5

Gene location (Human)
Chr.	Chromosome 2 (human)
Band	2p16.1	Start	54,972,187 bp
Band	2p16.1	End	55,112,621 bp

Gene location (Mouse)
Chr.	Chromosome 11 (mouse)
Band	11|11 A3.3	Start	29,642,947 bp
Band	11|11 A3.3	End	29,694,331 bp
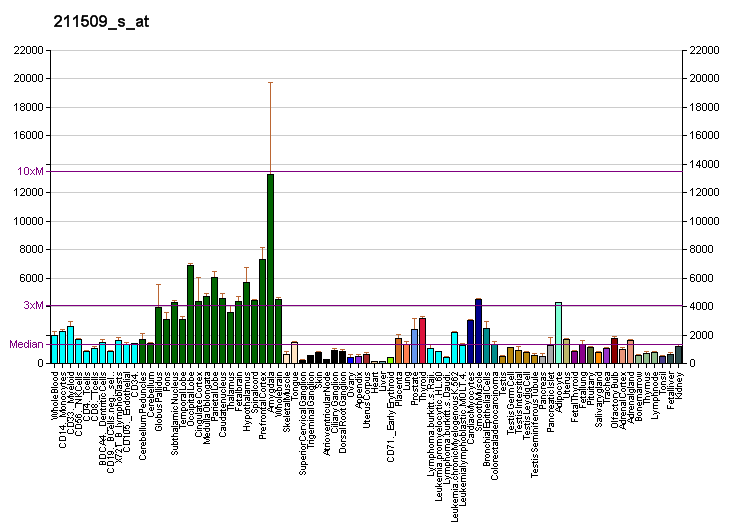

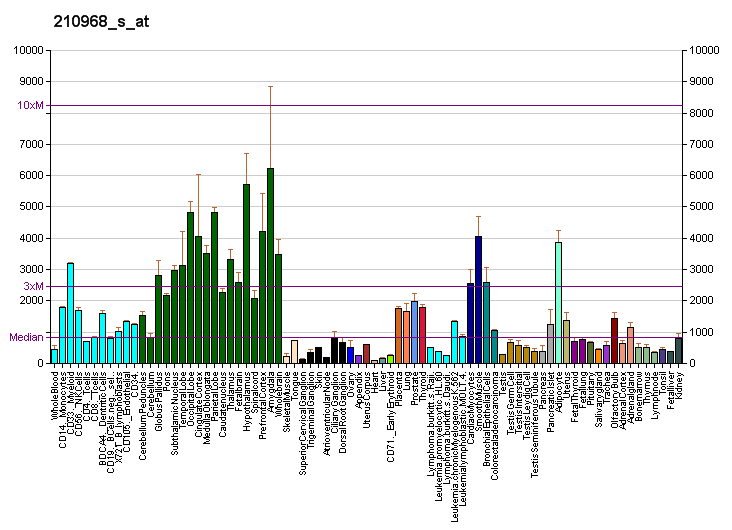

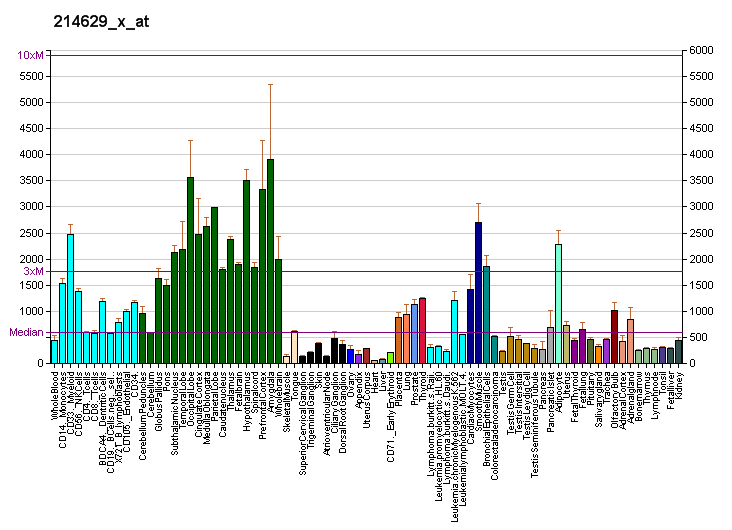
RNA expression pattern
Bgee	Human / Mouse (ortholog); Top expressed in: pons; parietal lobe; postcentral gyrus; superior vestibular nucleus; subthalamic nucleus; lateral nuclear group of thalamus; orbitofrontal cortex; pars compacta; pars reticulata; inferior ganglion of vagus nerve / Top expressed in: dorsal striatum; pontine nuclei; habenula; cingulate gyrus; lateral geniculate nucleus; deep cerebellar nuclei; medial dorsal nucleus; endothelial cell of lymphatic vessel; Epithelium of choroid plexus; olfactory tubercle; More reference expression data
BioGPS	More reference expression data
Gene ontology
Molecular function	protein binding; RNA binding; cadherin binding; ubiquitin protein ligase binding
Cellular component	integral component of membrane; cell projection; nuclear envelope; membrane; integral component of endoplasmic reticulum membrane; intracellular anatomical structure; endoplasmic reticulum; endoplasmic reticulum membrane; plasma membrane; extracellular exosome; postsynaptic density; endoplasmic reticulum tubular network; soma; endoplasmic reticulum tubular network membrane; cell junction
Biological process	nuclear pore complex assembly; regulation of apoptotic process; cerebral cortex radial glia-guided migration; regulation of branching morphogenesis of a nerve; cardiac epithelial to mesenchymal transition; negative regulation of axon extension; apoptotic process; negative regulation of axonogenesis; nervous system development; regulation of nervous system development; endoplasmic reticulum tubular network formation; endoplasmic reticulum tubular network organization; regulation of cell migration; negative regulation of cell growth; axonal fasciculation; positive regulation of epithelial cell migration; positive regulation of mammary gland epithelial cell proliferation; protein stabilization; positive regulation of protein kinase B signaling; positive regulation of protein localization to endoplasmic reticulum; positive regulation of ERBB3 signaling pathway; endoplasmic reticulum tubular network membrane organization; blastocyst formation; positive regulation of toll-like receptor 9 signaling pathway; protein localization to lysosome; cellular sphingolipid homeostasis
Sources:Amigo / QuickGO
Orthologs
Databases	NCBI: entry; OMA: entry
Species	Human	Mouse
Entrez	57142	68585
Ensembl	ENSG00000115310	ENSMUSG00000020458
UniProt	Q9NQC3	Q99P72
RefSeq (mRNA)	NM_007008; NM_020532; NM_153828; NM_207520; NM_207521 NM_001321859; NM_001321860; NM_001321861; NM_001321862; NM_001321863; NM_001321904	NM_024226; NM_194051; NM_194052; NM_194053; NM_194054
RefSeq (protein)	NP_001308788; NP_001308789; NP_001308790; NP_001308791; NP_001308792 NP_001308833; NP_008939; NP_065393; NP_722550; NP_997403; NP_997404	NP_077188; NP_918940; NP_918941; NP_918942; NP_918943
Location (UCSC)	Chr 2: 54.97 – 55.11 Mb	Chr 11: 29.64 – 29.69 Mb
PubMed search
- Wikidata
View/Edit Human	View/Edit Mouse

Reticulon 4, also known as Neurite outgrowth inhibitor or Nogo, is a protein that in humans is encoded by the RTN4 gene. It belongs to the family of reticulon-encoding genes, whose members are associated with the endoplasmic reticulum and participate in neuroendocrine secretion and membrane trafficking in neuroendocrine cells. The product of this gene is a potent inhibitor of neurite outgrowth and is thought to contribute to the limited regenerative capacity of the central nervous system in higher vertebrates.

== Structure ==
Alternatively spliced transcript variants derived from both differential splicing and differential promoter usage have been identified and encode distinct isoforms of Nogo. There are three known isoforms: Nogo-A, Nogo-B, and Nogo-C.

Nogo-A contains two characterized inhibitory domains: amino-Nogo at the N-terminus and Nogo-66, which forms the molecule's extracellular loop. Both domains participate in inhibitory signaling. Amino-Nogo acts as a strong inhibitor of neurite outgrowth, whereas Nogo-66 is involved in growth cone destruction.

== Function ==
Nogo has been identified as an inhibitor of neurite outgrowth specific to the central nervous system.

During neural development, Nogo is expressed mainly by neurons and provides an inhibitory signal for the migration and sprouting of CNS endothelial (tip) cells, thereby restricting blood vessel density.

Nogo also has functions beyond axonal growth inhibition. It has been identified as a key mediator in the process through which physical exercise enhances learning and memory in the brain.

Nogo-A has additionally been shown to negatively regulate vascular growth and repair following ischemic stroke. Genetic deletion and antibody-mediated blockade of Nogo-A enhanced revascularization and functional recovery in an experimental mouse model of stroke.

== Clinical significance ==
Because Nogo inhibits neurite regeneration, it has been investigated as a therapeutic target for nervous system repair. Research suggests that blocking Nogo-A following neuronal injury, including damage associated with diseases such as multiple sclerosis, may promote protection or restoration of injured neurons.

Investigation into the mechanisms of this protein has generated interest for the treatment of auto-immune mediated demyelinating diseases and spinal cord injury regeneration.

Following ischemic stroke, treatment with anti-Nogo-A antibodies was also found to reduce vascular leakage, a major complication associated with post-stroke tissue injury.

== Interactions ==
Reticulon 4 has been shown to interact with WWP1, BCL2-like 1 and Bcl-2.

== See also ==
- Reticulon 4 receptor
