= Spastin =

Protein

SPAST

Identifiers
- Aliases: SPAST, ADPSP, FSP2, SPG4, spastin
- External IDs: OMIM: 604277; MGI: 1858896; GeneCards: SPAST
Available structures
PDB	Ortholog search: PDBe RCSB
PDB	List of PDB id codes 3EAB, 3VFD
Enzyme activity
EC #	BRENDA	ExPASy	KEGG	MetaCyc
5.6.1.1	↗	↗	↗	↗

Gene location (Human)
Chr.	Chromosome 2 (human)
Band	2p22.3	Start	32,063,556 bp
Band	2p22.3	End	32,157,637 bp

Gene location (Mouse)
Chr.	Chromosome 17 (mouse)
Band	17|17 E2	Start	74,645,982 bp
Band	17|17 E2	End	74,698,110 bp
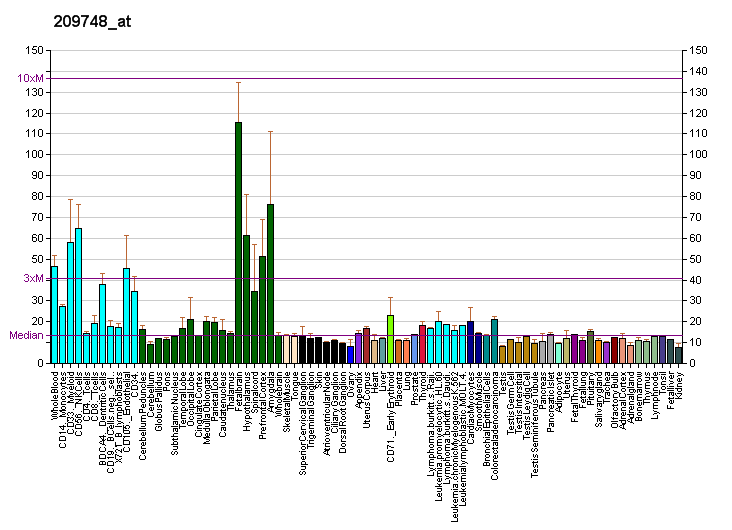

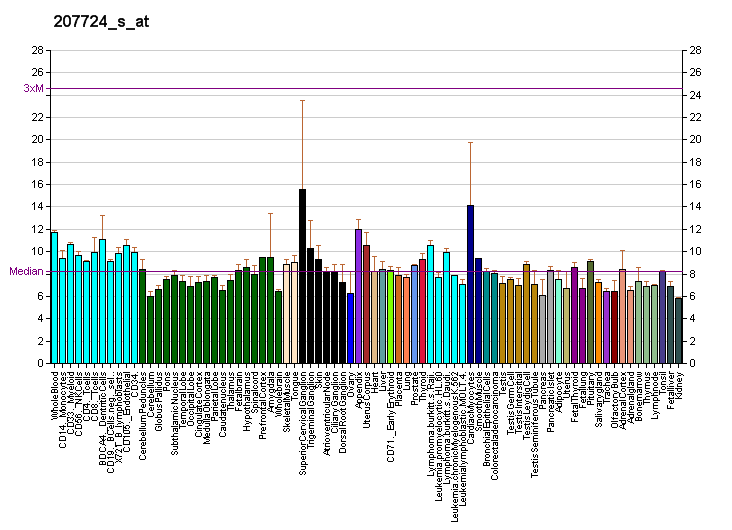
RNA expression pattern
Bgee	Human / Mouse (ortholog); Top expressed in: oocyte; secondary oocyte; ganglionic eminence; Achilles tendon; palpebral conjunctiva; epithelium of nasopharynx; ventricular zone; germinal epithelium; endothelial cell; tibia / Top expressed in: secondary oocyte; zygote; barrel cortex; primary oocyte; medullary collecting duct; medial ganglionic eminence; trigeminal ganglion; sexually immature organism; superior cervical ganglion; spermatocyte; More reference expression data
BioGPS	More reference expression data
Gene ontology
Molecular function	nucleotide binding; alpha-tubulin binding; microtubule-severing ATPase activity; protein binding; catalytic activity; hydrolase activity; ATP binding; beta-tubulin binding; microtubule binding; isomerase activity; ATPase activity; protein-containing complex binding
Cellular component	cytoplasm; endosome; membrane; microtubule cytoskeleton; spindle; microtubule organizing center; midbody; endoplasmic reticulum; perinuclear region of cytoplasm; microtubule; extracellular exosome; cytoplasmic vesicle; nucleus; cytoskeleton; axon cytoplasm; nuclear membrane; lipid droplet; endoplasmic reticulum membrane; nucleoplasm; cytosol; endoplasmic reticulum tubular network; ESCRT III complex; centrosome; integral component of membrane
Biological process	cell differentiation; nervous system development; positive regulation of cytokinesis; multicellular organism development; cell division; microtubule bundle formation; cell cycle; metabolism; protein homooligomerization; nuclear membrane reassembly; exit from mitosis; mitotic cytokinesis; cytoplasmic microtubule organization; microtubule severing; anterograde axonal transport; mitotic spindle disassembly; axonal transport of mitochondrion; membrane fission; endoplasmic reticulum to Golgi vesicle-mediated transport; protein hexamerization; cytokinetic process; axonogenesis; positive regulation of microtubule depolymerization; cytoskeleton-dependent cytokinesis
Sources:Amigo / QuickGO
Orthologs
Databases	NCBI: entry; OMA: entry
Species	Human	Mouse
Entrez	6683	50850
Ensembl	ENSG00000021574	ENSMUSG00000024068
UniProt	Q9UBP0	Q9QYY8
RefSeq (mRNA)	NM_014946; NM_199436; NM_001363823; NM_001363875; NM_001377959	NM_001162870; NM_016962; NM_001357738
RefSeq (protein)	NP_055761; NP_955468; NP_001350752; NP_001350804; NP_001364888	NP_001156342; NP_058658; NP_001344667
Location (UCSC)	Chr 2: 32.06 – 32.16 Mb	Chr 17: 74.65 – 74.7 Mb
PubMed search
- Wikidata
View/Edit Human	View/Edit Mouse

Spastin is a microtubule-severing protein encoded in humans by the SPAST gene.

Spastin is a member of the AAA (ATPases associated with a variety of cellular activities) protein family. Members of this protein family share an ATPase domain and have roles in diverse cellular processes including membrane trafficking, intracellular motility, organelle biogenesis, protein folding, and proteolysis. The encoded ATPase may be involved in the assembly or function of nuclear protein complexes. Two transcript variants encoding distinct isoforms have been identified for this gene. Other alternative splice variants have been described but their full length sequences have not been determined. Mutations associated with this gene cause the most frequent form of autosomal dominant spastic paraplegia 4 (SPG4).
