= Jane Coffin Childs Memorial Fund for Medical Research =

U.S. cancer research foundation

- Founded: 1937
- Founder: Starling Winston Childs and Alice S. Coffin
- Headquarters: New Haven, Connecticut
- Fields: Biomedical research
- Key people: Anita Pepper, PhD, Executive Director
- Website: www.jccfund.org

The Jane Coffin Childs Memorial Fund for Medical Research (the "JCC"), established in 1937, awards the "Jane Coffin Childs Postdoctoral Fellowship" for research in the medical and related sciences bearing on cancer.

== History ==
The Fund was founded on June 11, 1937, by Starling Winston Childs and Alice S. Coffin, in memory of Jane Coffin Childs, who had died of cancer in October 1936. The Fund was established for the purpose of supporting research into the causes and treatment of cancer.

== Description ==
Currently, the Foundation awards 20 to 30 fellowships per year. The fellowship is regarded as one of the most prestigious fellowships in the US, and postdoctoral candidates are awarded with a three-year support. The researchers and the research labs where the fellows conduct their projects have made major scientific contributions in areas such as the advancement of our understanding of cancer and other human diseases. There have been more than sixteen hundred Jane Coffin Childs fellows doing basic cancer-related research in laboratories in North America, Europe, Japan, and Australia.

Over the years, the Fund has attracted prominent scientists to its Board of Scientific Advisers, including Nobel laureates David Baltimore, Elizabeth Blackburn, and Randy Schekman, among others. As of 2024, 17 former board members had earned the Nobel Prize.

The Jane Coffin Childs Memorial Fund for Medical Research is dedicated to providing financial support to offer highly qualified postdoctoral fellows the opportunity to pursue research into the causes and origins of cancer and other human diseases. The goal of the Fund is to support the brightest postdoctoral fellows in biomedical research pursuing disease-related research while promoting and emphasizing the value and contribution of the individual in keeping with the spirit of the conception of the Fund.

Seven Nobel laureates have been among the Fund's fellows: Joshua Lederberg, Thomas A. Steitz, George de Hevesy, Jacques Monod, George D. Snell, Edward L. Tatum, and David Julius.
