= Organelle biogenesis =

Organelle biogenesis refers to the processes by which eukaryotic cells form, grow, maintain, and distribute their intracellular organelles. Many organelles proliferate by growth and division of pre‑existing structures, while others (notably peroxisomes and lipid droplets) can also arise *de novo* from precursor membranes of the endoplasmic reticulum (ER).

Organelle abundance and composition are regulated by developmental and metabolic cues, and defects in biogenesis contribute to human disease. Peroxisome biogenesis disorders (Zellweger spectrum) exemplify how failure to assemble or maintain a class of organelles can lead to severe metabolic pathology.

== Discovery ==
Following the discovery of cellular organelles in the nineteenth century, little was known about their function and synthesis until the development of electron microscopy and subcellular fractionation in the twentieth century. This allowed experiments on the function, structure, and biogenesis of these organelles to commence.

Mechanisms of protein sorting and retrieval have been found to give organelles their characteristic composition. It is known that cellular organelles can come from preexisting organelles; however, it is a subject of controversy whether organelles can be created without a preexisting one.

== Process ==
Several processes are known to have developed for organelle biogenesis. These can range from de novo synthesis to the copying of a template organelle; the formation of an organelle 'from scratch' and using a preexisting organelle as a template to manufacture an organelle, respectively. The distinct structures of each organelle are thought to be caused by the different mechanisms of the processes which create them and the proteins that they are made up of. Organelles may also be 'split' between two cells during the process of cellular division (known as organelle inheritance), where the organelle of the parent cell doubles in size and then splits with each half being delivered to their respective daughter cells.

The process of organelle biogenesis is known to be regulated by specialized transcription networks that modulate the expression of the genes that code for specific organellar proteins. In order for organelle biogenesis to be carried out properly, the specific genes coding for the organellar proteins must be transcribed properly and the translation of the resulting mRNA must be successful. In addition to this, the process requires the transfer of polypeptides to their site of function, guided by signaling peptides. If proteins are not directed to their respective sites of subcellular function, a defective organelle that fails to fulfill its tasks within the cell properly may result.

Several metabolic diseases are known to be caused by a fault in the process of organelle biogenesis. These may include mitochondrial biogenesis defects, peroxisome biogenesis disorders, and lysosomal storage disorders.
