= Tearney =

Tearney is a surname. Notable people with the surname include:

- Carlos Tearney, American martial artist
- Finn Tearney (born 1990), New Zealand tennis player
- Guillermo J. Tearney (born 1966), American pathologist

== See also ==
- Kearney (surname)
- Tierney
