= Max Planck Institute of Psychiatry =

Research institute in Munich, Germany

- Max-Planck-Institut für Psychiatrie
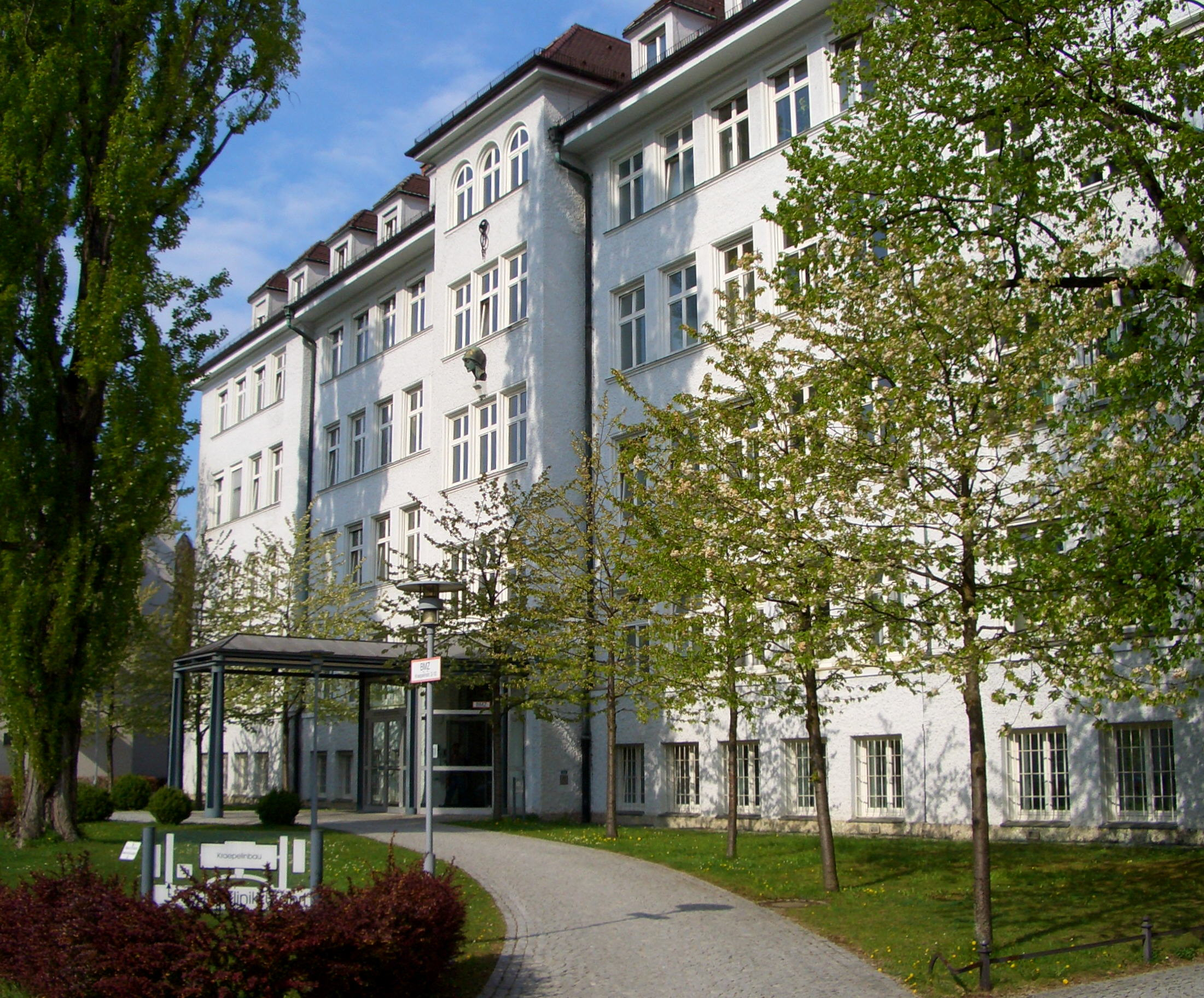
- West wing of the institute
- Formation: 13 February 1917; 109 years ago
- Type: Research institute
- Purpose: Basic research
- Headquarters: Munich, Germany
- Coordinates: 48°10′25.16″N 11°34′34.09″E
- Fields: Developmental biology, evolutionary biology, genetics, immunology, infection biology, medicine, neuroscience, physiology, cognitive science
- Key people: Emil Kraepelin (founder)
- Parent organization: Max Planck Society
- Website: (in English)
- Formerly called: German Institute for Psychiatric Research

The Max Planck Institute of Psychiatry (German: Max-Planck-Institut für Psychiatrie) is a research institute based in the city of Munich in Germany specializing in psychiatry. Currently directed by Elisabeth Binder and Alon Chen, it is one of the 81 institutes in the Max Planck Society.

== History ==
The institute was founded as the German Institute for Psychiatric Research (German: Deutsche Forschungsanstalt für Psychiatrie) by King Ludwig III of Bavaria in Munich on February 13, 1917. The main force behind the institute was the psychiatrist Emil Kraepelin. Substantial funding was received from the Jewish-American banker James Loeb, as well as from the Rockefeller Foundation, well into the 1930s. The institute became affiliated with the K. W. Society for the Advancement of Science (German: Kaiser-Wilhelm-Gesellschaft zur Förderung der Wissenschaften) in 1924.

In 1928 a new building of the institute was opened at 2 Kraepelinstrasse. The building was financed primarily by a donation of $325,000 from the Rockefeller Foundation. Under the leadership of department heads Walther Spielmeyer, Ernst Rüdin, Felix Plaut, Kurt Schneider and Franz Jahnel, the institute gained an international reputation as a leading institution for psychiatric research.

Rudin, a student of Kraepelin's, took over the directorship of the institute in 1931, while also remaining head of genetics. As well as fostering an international scientific reputation, the institute developed close ties with the Nazi regime. Rudin (along with Eugen Fischer of the Kaiser Wilhelm Institute of Anthropology, Human Heredity, and Eugenics) joined expert government committees. Rudin wrote the official commentary endorsing the forced sterilization laws. He was such an avid proponent that colleagues nicknamed him the "Reichsfuhrer for Sterilization". Felix Plaut (in 1935) and Kurt Neubürger were dismissed from the institute due to their Jewish origin. Copies of Rudin's lecture notes show that his teaching at the institute was anti-semitic. The institute received a great deal of government funding, which was openly designed to further the Nazi regime's aims. Some institute funds seem to have gone on to support the work of institute employee Julius Deussen with Carl Schneider at Heidelberg University, clinical research which from the beginning involving killing children.

During the Second World War, the institute's facilities sustained much damage. After the war, Rudin claimed he was just an academic, had only heard rumours of the killing of psychiatric patients at nearby asylums, and that he hated the Nazis. He was supported by former institute colleague Josef Kallmann (a eugenicist himself) and famous quantum physicist Max Planck and released with a 500 mark fine.

In 1954 the institute was incorporated into the Max Planck Society (as successive institution of the Kaiser-Wilhelm-Gesellschaft zur Förderung der Wissenschaften under maintenance of the foundation of 1917). The institute was divided into an Institute of Brain Pathology and a Clinical Institute, both at 2 Kraepelinstrasse. Twelve years later in 1966, the institute was renamed as the Max Planck Institute of Psychiatry. In the same year, a new research clinic was opened in Kraepelinstrasse 10.

In 1984 the theoretical part of the institute moved to a new building in Martinsried, west of Munich. The Departments of Neurochemistry, Neuromorphology, Neuropharmacology and Neurophysiology were moved there. The Clinical Department, the Departments of Ethology and Psychology remained in Kraepelinstrasse. The independent Research Center of Psychopathology and Psychotherapy were closed.

In 1989 the institute's building in Kraepelinstrasse was renovated and enlarged with the addition of a new laboratory wing.

In 1998 the theoretical part and the clinical part of the institute segregated. The theoretical division of the institute became the Max Planck Institute of Neurobiology and the clinical part kept the name "Max Planck Institute of Psychiatry".

== Research ==
The institute is one of the leading research centers on psychiatry. Physicians, psychologists, and natural scientists conduct research on psychiatric and on the development of diagnosis and treatment.

Many patients participate in different clinical trials each year. Extensive phenotyping of the patients with analysis of blood and fluid samples, clinical psychopathology and neuropsychological testing, neurophysiological methods, neuroimaging techniques, and protein and gene analyses form the basis to investigate the causation of complex psychiatric and neurological diseases.

The concept of the institute is based on a suitable balance between clinical and laboratory research. Research groups work on topics such as stress, anxiety, Posttraumatic stress disorder, depression, psychopharmacology, sleep, and other topics.

The institute consists of a 120-bed clinic equipped with laboratories for research on sleep physiology, several special wards, a dayclinic for depression and psychiatry and various laboratories for cell and molecular biology.

== Medical services ==
The institute provides medical service for psychiatric and neurological disorders. It has a hospital, dayclinic for depression and psychiatry and several outpatient clinics. The hospital consists of four psychiatric and one neurological ward with 120 beds. It treats about 2000 inpatients per year.

The institute provides treatment for depression, anxiety disorder, sleep disorders, multiple sclerosis, Morbus Parkinson.

== Organization ==
The following are the primary heads of the institute's respective departments:

Scientific directors

- Elisabeth Binder (managing director)
- Alon Chen
- Nadine Gogolla

Interim Head of Clinic

- Peter Falkai

== See also ==
- Max Planck Institute for Brain Research (Frankfurt)
- Institute of Psychiatry (UK)
