= Nissl =

Nissl may refer to:

- Nissl body, also known as Nissl substance or Nissl material, a component of neurons
- Franz Nissl, the German medical researcher who discovered them using his Nissl-staining
