= Confocal endoscopy =

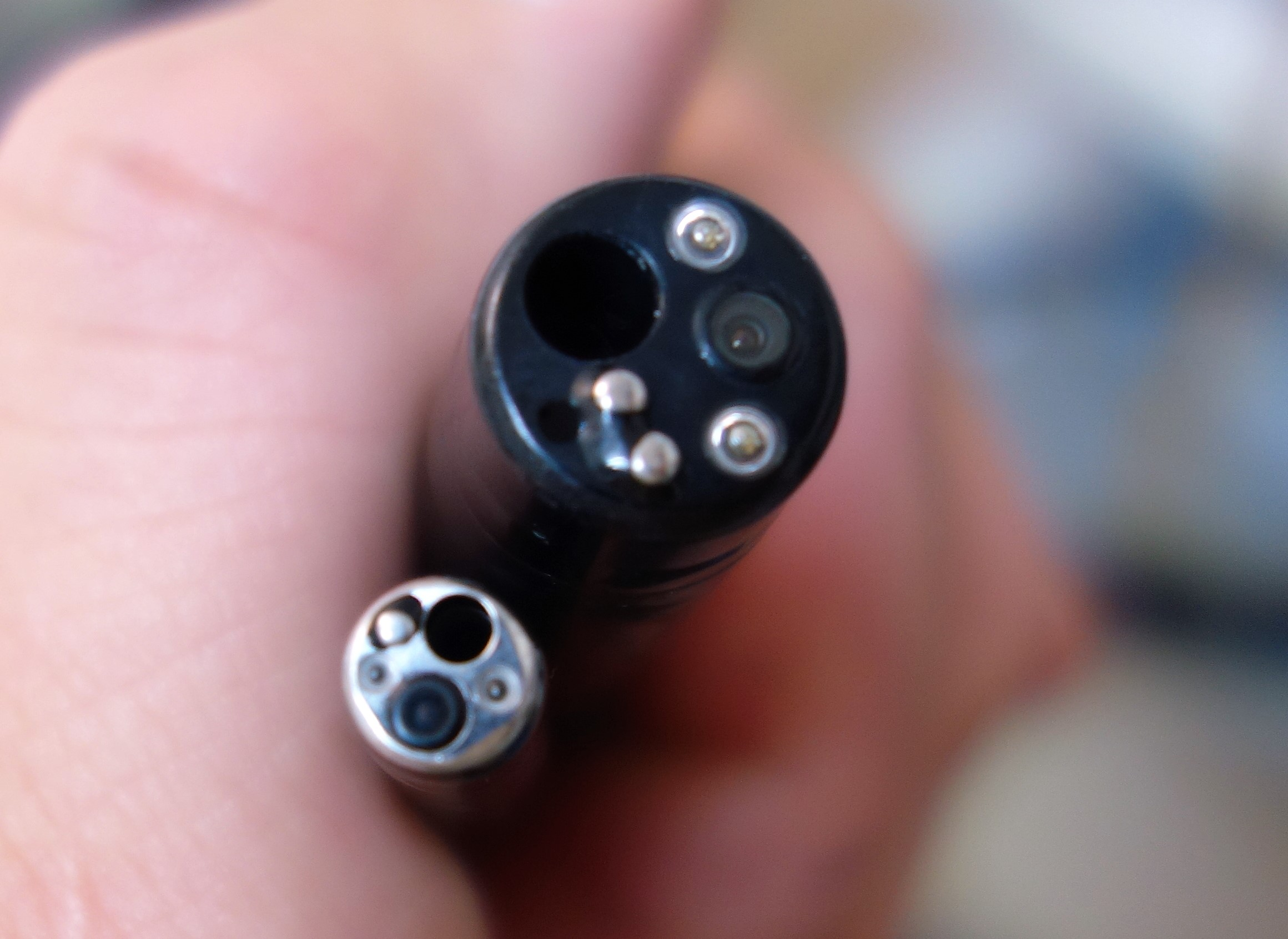
- Insertion tip of an endoscope

Confocal endoscopy, or confocal laser endomicroscopy (CLE), is a modern imaging technique that allows the examination of real-time microscopic and histological features inside the body. In the word "endomicroscopy", endo- means "within" and -skopein means "to view or observe". CLE, also known as "optical biopsy", can analyse histology and cytology features of a tissue which otherwise is only possible by tissue biopsy. Similar to confocal microscopy, the laser in CLE filtered by the pinhole excites the fluorescent dye through a beam splitter and objective lens. The fluorescent emission then follows similar paths into the detector. A pinhole is used to select emissions from the desired focal plane. Two categories of CLE exist, namely probe-based (pCLE) and the less common endoscopy-based endoscopy (eCLE).

CLE can be intubated to study the gastrointestinal (GI) tract and accessory digestive organs with a fluorescent dye. A variety of diseases, including inflammatory bowel disease (IBD) and Barrett's oesophagus, can be diagnosed by the magnified and in-depth view in combination with traditional endoscopy.

== Significance ==
CLE can identify the lesions with a small depths of view under the tissue, in contrast to the surface level in conventional endoscopy. It also allows clinicians to discriminate benign or malignant lesions through real-time histological diagnosis by revealing the properties of the lamina at a cellular level.

An example is Whipple's disease. Conventional endoscopy presents a whitish-patterned duodenal mucosa. CLE, in comparison, generates two images –– the superficial images show capillary leak in duodenal mucosa while the deep images show cells of duodenal mucosa, including goblet cells and foamy macrophages in lamina propria. Compared to histological examination of the same duodenal site after periodic acid-Schiff staining, CLE identifies similar patterns of goblet cells and foamy macrophages.

== Types ==
Two types of CLE have been invented, namely probe-based (pCLE) and endoscope-based CLE (eCLE).

=== Probe-based CLE ===
pCLE, developed by Mauna Kea Technologies, is a fibre bundle transit through the 2.8 mm working channel (the hollow hole) of the standard endoscope into the GI tract. With a fixed plane of imaging, each fibre acts as a pinhole to filter unwanted noise. The frame rate lies between 9 and 12 images/second.

pCLE Products	Usage
GastroFlex	Upper GI
ConolFlex	Lower GI
CholangioFlex	Cholangiopancreatography
AQ-19	Fine needle aspiration
Needle-based CLE	Endoscopic ultrasound needle (EUS)

=== Endoscope-based CLE ===
eCLE, developed by Pentax, is a confocal microscopy fixed at the end of the endoscopic tube. The integrated machine of eCLE is larger than the pCLE in diameter, making GI tract endoscopic intubation more difficult. eCLE has ceased commercially due to the camera's inflexibility.

== Medical uses ==
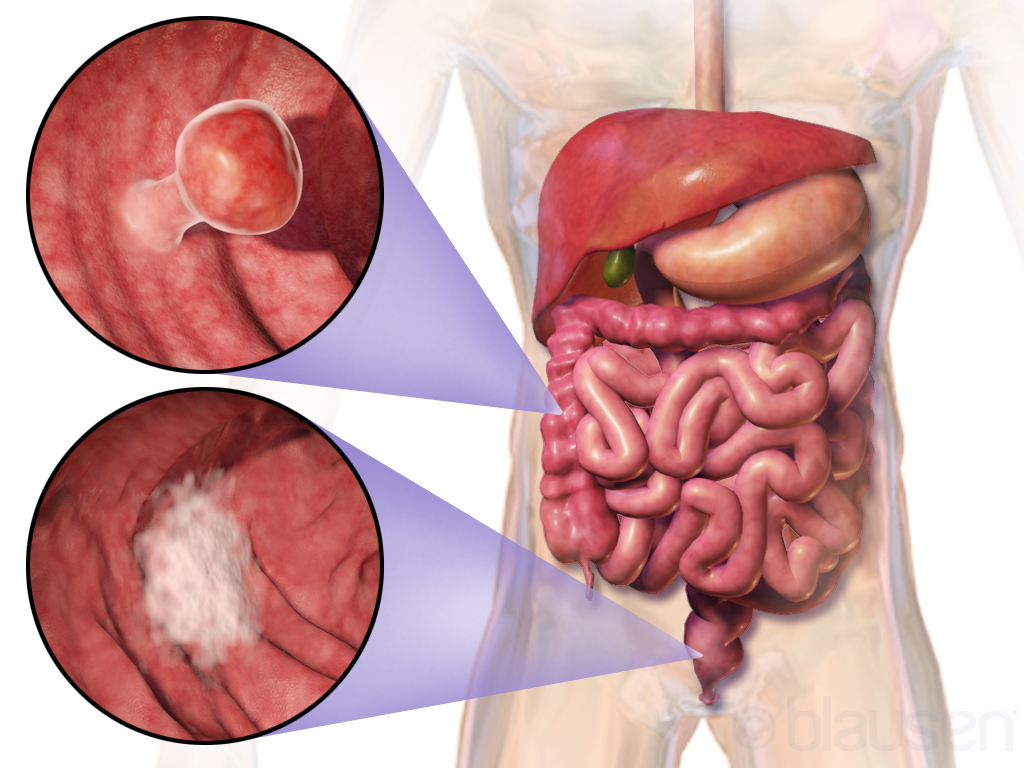
Colorectal cancer

=== Oesophagus ===
CLE is effective in detecting premalignant, including Barrett's oesophagus, and malignant (cancerous) lesions in the upper GI tract. The modifications of mucosa shown in histopathology as an index of malignancy can be identified under CLE, such as high-grade dysplasia. CLE can also be implemented to refer to the treatment of Barrett's oesophagus by measuring the lateral extent of neoplasia.

The Miami classification is the most popular system in oesophageal CLE diagnosis.

=== Stomach and duodenum ===
Similar to that of the oesophagus, CLE is able to detect early gastric cancer, as well as premalignant conditions, such as gastritis and intestinal metaplasia. CLE can detect and distinguish the stomach pit patterns to identify the disease in accordance with the Miami classification, which was refined in 2016 to include both pit patterns and the architecture of blood vessels. The refined classification allows clinicians to differentiate between neoplastic and non-neoplastic lesions.

The presence of Helicobacter pylori can also be identified using CLE by viewing the morphological changes in tissues.

=== Lower Gastrointestinal Tract ===
CLE reveals "soccer ball-like pattern" of narrower capillaries in malignant lymphomas; distorted architecture and fluorescein leakage from lumen in colonic adenocarcinoma; and blunt-shaped villi and crypts and increased intraepithelial lymphocytes in coeliac disease.

CLE can be utilized to identify adenoma and neoplasia in colorectal polyps and lesions. The Miami classification provides guidelines for clinicians to differentiate neoplastic and non-neoplastic lesions.

==== Inflammatory Bowel Disease (IBD) ====
CLE can be used for the identification of IBD and its subtypes (Crohn's disease and ulcerative colitis) based on the observation on morphological characteristics, such as architectural distortion, lowered crypt density, crypt irregularity and an abnormally high density of epithelial gaps. The prediction of IBD progression on non-inflamed epithelium is achievable, too, making way for a novel "treat-to-target" therapeutic approach.

=== Pancreas ===
Incorporating an EUS, CLE can accurately diagnose pancreatic cystic lesions, including mucinous and non-mucinous lesions. Special needles are used to collect fluid and cyst wall tissues for testing. Pancreatic ductal adenocarcinoma (PDAC) can also be viewed by CLE. Observing cystic lesions and PDAC, clinicians can identify early chronic pancreatitis and determine the malignancies of lesions.

=== Biliary duct ===
Biliary stricture can be viewed by CLE. The Miami and Paris classifications can be adapted to differentiate cancerous and inflammatory causes.

=== Others ===
The discrimination of inflammation and malignant tumor in lung and the urinary system may be done by using CLE and this is currently under research. Some usages such as oral and other head-and-neck cancer diagnosis have been proposed.

=== Molecular imaging ===
Tumour angiogenesis (formation of blood vessels) by VEGF

Antibodies of molecular targets are used to diagnose GI diseases by histology. CLE captures the fluorescence produced by specific antibodies binding to vascular endothelial growth factor (VEGF). Comparing the significant difference in fluorescent strength, clinicians can differentiate normal and neoplastic tissue. Molecular imaging with antibodies may be applied to CLE as a diagnostic benchmark due to high correlation with ex vivo microscopy.

The molecular imaging technique can be used in a similar manner in the examination of head and neck cancer using CLE, though the diagnostic targets may be different from those in the gastrointestinal tract.

== Mechanism ==
Principle of a confocal point sensor –– 1) light source, 2) beam splitter, 3) specimen, 4) focal plane, 5) receiver pinhole, 6) photo detector, 7) illumination pinhole, 8) illumination beam, 9) observation beam from focal plane, 10) observation beam out of focal plane

=== Basic mechanism ===
The laser emitted by CLE through a pinhole is reflected by the beam splitter or a dichroic mirror and focused by an objective lens. The fluorescent dye in targeted tissue is excited and emits a specific wavelength. The emission from the focal plane of the tissue then is collected by the objective lens and the beam splitter. The laser is eventually filtered by a pinhole to reduce out-of-focus noise to enter the detector or photomultiplier tube. By including only light reflected from the same focal plane and excluding any other reflective scatter, the system captures a small, highly detailed section of the tissue. This illumination and detection process is repeated across the whole tissue sample to build a complete image. Limiting the focal plane in this way allows for optical sectioning which reduces the haze observed in standard light microscopy.

==== Topical dyes ====
Cresyl violet and acriflavine can be used as topical dyes. Cresyl violet is a common stain in histology used for light microscopy sections, especially brain sections. In CLE, it can enhance the viewing of the cytoplasm, yet it limits tissue penetration and does not show anything about vasculature. Acriflavine is an antiseptic and dye. In CLE, it can stain the nuclei of GI surface epithelial cells. It is however subjected to cytotoxic and mutagenic properties, in addition to common side effects of irritation.

==== Intravenous dyes ====
Chemical structure of fluorescein

Fluorescein is the most popular IV dye for CLE. Fluorescein is an FDA-cleared dye that is used in ophthalmology clinics in routine as it appears green under cobalt blue light. It is commonly applied topically to identify corneal diseases with slit lamp microscopes including corneal abrasion, ulcers, and infections; or intravenously to identify retinal diseases with angiography including macular degeneration and diabetic retinopathy. In CLE, it is usually administered intravenously immediately before the intubation of an endoscopic tube. The fluorescence is reported to be the most prominent from a few seconds to 8 minutes. Fluorescein is slowly eliminated; thus the fluorescence slowly decays up to a minimal detectable level after 1 hour, giving a time window for clinicians to investigate.

=== Recognition and optical flow algorithm ===
CLE's narrow field of vision makes it difficult for clinicians to identify the location and path of the probe, making it challenging to correspond the image obtained and the lesion location and direction. Research has proposed a crypt recognition algorithm, which predicts the pixel displacement by the moving angle and distance. By restoring the exploration path of CLE, clinicians can locate the sites of interest and improve diagnostic efficiency.

=== Resolution ===
The resulting image resolution is determined by the numerical aperture (NA) of the objective lens, the refraction index of the surrounding media (η), the wavelength of light (λ), and the pinhole size. A shorter wavelength allows smaller features to be distinguished and a higher NA allows the system to collect more light and resolve finer details. Similarly, smaller pinholes can block scattered light, although if too small can reduce signal intensity. The refractive index of the media surrounding the tissue also impacts the final image quality by influencing how laser’s light is focused. Ultimately lateral and axial resolution can be defined by:

R_{lateral} = 0.4λ / NA

R_{axial} = 1.4λη / (NA)^{2}

=== Image quality assessment ===
Research has proposed a new assessment method for filtering images yielded from CLE. As CLE often encounters image distortions, the degradation of image quality and loss of image information, eventually increase the difficulty of accurate diagnosis. A new image quality assessment (IQA) utilising Weber's Law and local descriptors assesses the quality and filters images with low diagnostic value.

== Limitations ==
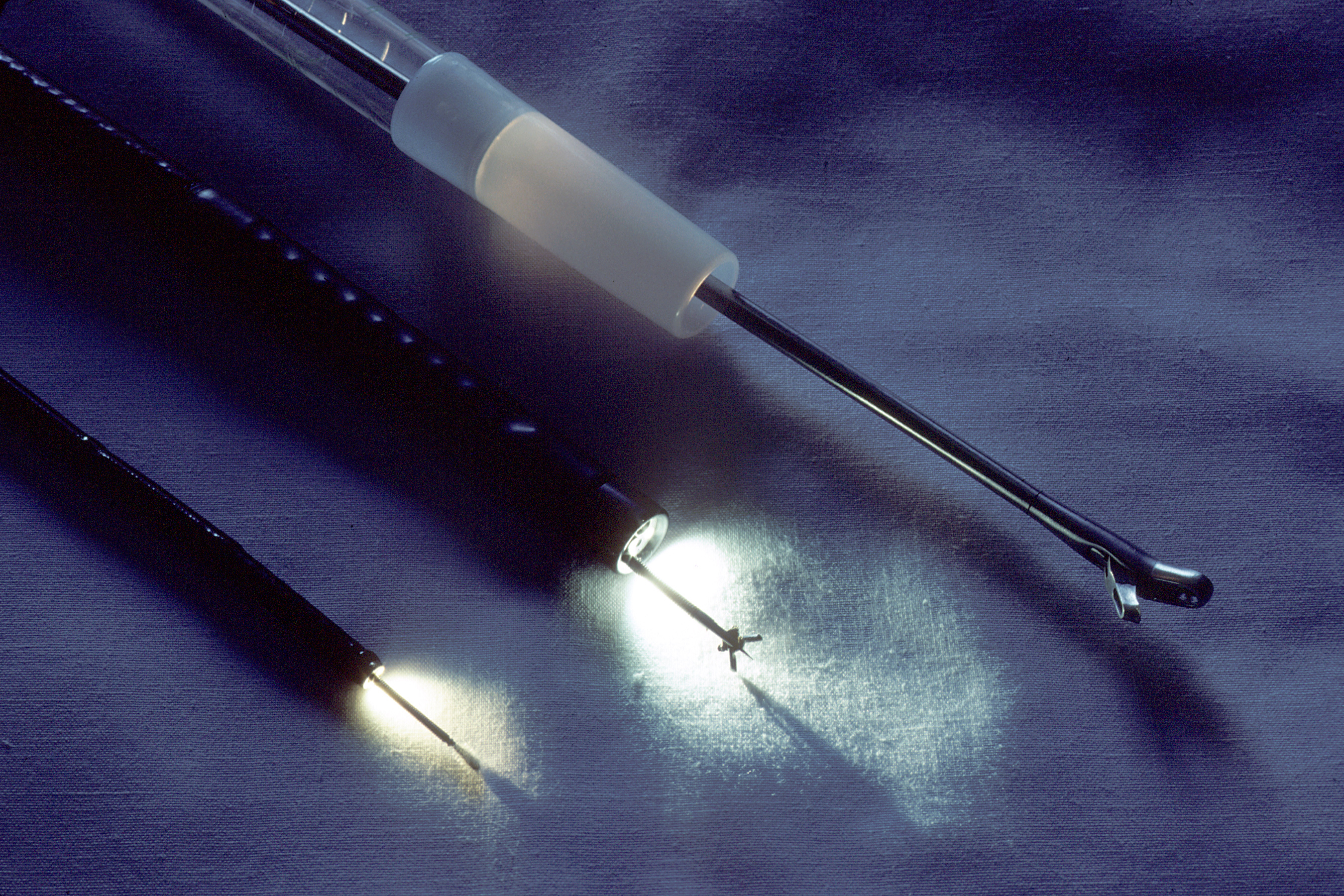
Endoscopy with biopsy forceps in the working channel (the hollow tube)

The variety of pathology conditions identifiable by CLE is limited. The histological diagnosis is limited to cancerous lesions and inflammation where the number of specific diseases identifiable is not numerous. Moreover, it requires specific training to operate CLE and correctly interpret CLE images, which are rarely used skills by experts in endoscopy. Owing to the narrow field of view, the applications of CLE might be restricted. Computer-aided diagnosis with AI technology may be beneficial in diagnosing CLE images.

Fluorescein is the only safe dye approved while cresyl violet and acriflavine are commonly used agents. The lack of choice of contrast agents may limit the application of CLE. For instance, patients allergic to fluorescein should never undergo CLE that involves the use of this intravenous dye.

The optical system consists of complex microscopic optical instruments, which are difficult to manufacture and assemble. Therefore, the tool is expensive.

CLE is mostly used in combination with other techniques instead of replacing conventional endoscopy with biopsy. CLE can only serve as a complementary to the traditional biopsy. By sharing the same working channel, conventional biopsy and CLE can be done alternatively by single intubation.

== Adverse effects ==
Intubation of endoscope

CLE is generally considered a safe imaging technique due to the low-power lasers and minimally invasive probes. The laser used in non-ionizing, blue visible light that would not cause tissue damage. Additionally, procedures only involve brief exposure times making this technique well tolerated and safe for repeated use. The allergic properties of fluorescein, the common intravenous fluorescent dye for CLE, is the major culprit for the mild adverse events.

=== Intubation ===
CLE, similar to other diagnostic endoscopic techniques, may give rise to pancreatitis when used to examine the pancreas. The likelihood for pancreatitis is especially high in needle-based CLE. The incidence can be minimized by shortening the inspection time and avoiding excessive needle movement within the pancreatic cyst wall.

=== Fluorescein ===
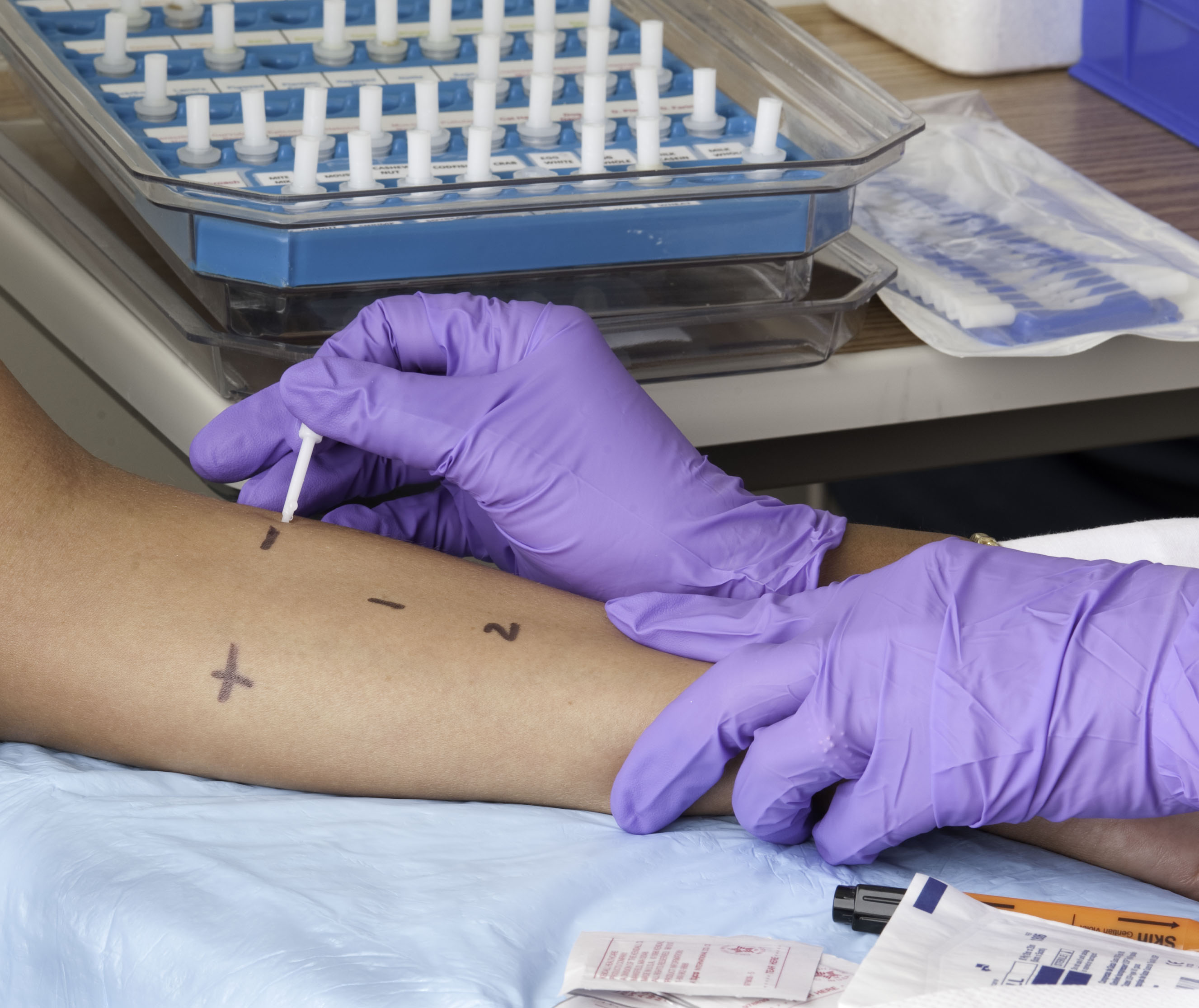
Skin prick testing for allergies

Mild side effects, which are rare, include

- Nausea
- Vomiting with mild epigastric pain
- Rash at injection site
- Transient hypotension without shock
- Diffuse erythema

These effects are manageable unless patients have prior experiences of them.

Cases of anaphylaxis are reported by ophthalmological uses of fluorescein. Prophylactic use of antihistamines can reduce the chances of allergic reactions or skin prick tests can identify the risk of allergic reactions.

=== Acriflavine ===
Acriflavine, another contrast agent for CLE, is potentially carcinogenic to humans due to its known mutagenic ability. The dye is therefore not approved by the FDA.

== Regulations ==
CLE is currently regulated both in the US and Europe to ensure its safety and clinical effectiveness. In the United States, the Food and Drug Administration (FDA) has cleared two main types of CLE systems, one of them being the Cellvizio series by Mauna Kea Technologies through the 510(k) process. These include both probe-based and endoscope-based systems, intended for imaging internal microstructures of tissues accessed during standard endoscopic procedures. FDA approval covers various mini probes for specific anatomical indications, and recent updates have extended approval to new models and the use of additional contrast agents.

Additionally, in Europe, CLE devices (including the Cellvizio system and related miniprobes) are regulated as Class IIa medical devices and must bear CE marking to be distributed and used clinically.

== History ==
CLE is a modern, in vivo adaptation of confocal microscopy, the microscopic technique invented by Marvin Minsky in 1957.

Since 2004, CLE has been used for observing histopathological changes in gastrointestinal tissues.

== See also ==
- Confocal microscopy
- Endoscopy
- Contrast agent
