= Boudoux =

Boudoux is a French surname. Notable people with the surname include:

- Caroline Boudoux, Canadian biomedical and optical engineer
- Marc Boudoux (born 1959), French rower

== See also ==
- The Indestructible (film), 1959 French comedy including a character named Mr. Boudoux
