= Axotomy =

Severing of the axon of a neuron

- MeSH: D019771

In cellular neuroscience, an axotomy (from axo- 'axon' and -tomy 'surgery') is the cutting or otherwise severing of an axon. This type of denervation is often used in experimental studies on neuronal physiology and neuronal death or survival as a method to better understand nervous system diseases.

Axotomy may cause neuronal cell death, especially in embryonic or neonatal animals, as this is the period in which neurons are dependent on their targets for the supply of survival factors. In mature animals, where survival factors are derived locally or via autocrine loops, axotomy of peripheral neurons and motoneurons can lead to a robust regenerative response without any neuronal death. In both cases, autophagy is observed to markedly increase. Autophagy could either clear the way for neuronal degeneration or it could be a medium for cell destruction.

== Axotomy response ==
=== Peripheral (extrinsic) ===
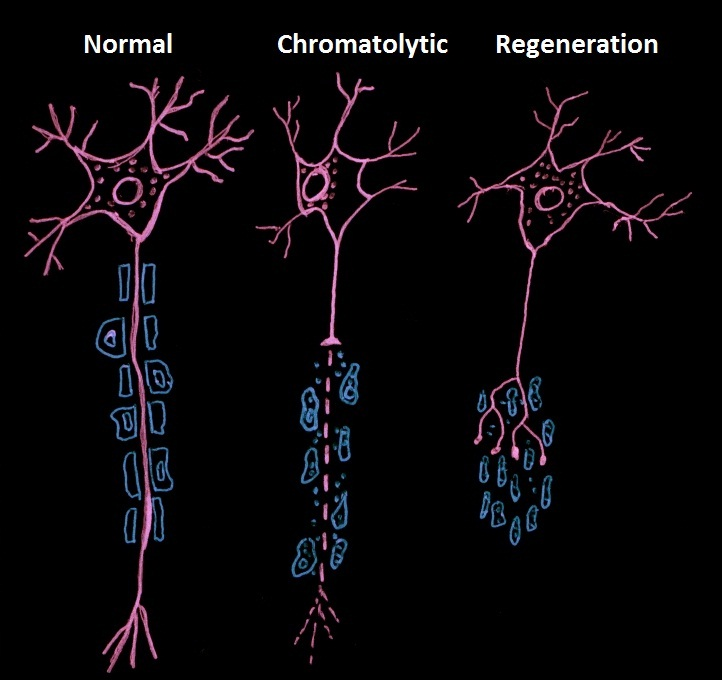
This drawing compares a normal neuron to one undergoing chromatolysis after axonal injury. Regeneration after axonal injury may occur.

Upon injury of a peripheral axon, the entire neuron immediately reacts in order to regenerate the axon. This reaction requires an increased metabolic activity and is initiated by chromatolysis. Chromatolysis is characterized as the dissolution of protein-producing structures in the cell body of a neuron and is a term used to characterize apoptosis of neuronal cells. During chromatolysis, the soma and nucleus round and enlarge, the Nissl bodies and Golgi bodies both disintegrate, and the cytocentrum is cleared. In most cases, the axotomy response in peripheral axons ends in cell healing and regeneration, though it may occasionally end in cell death. Regeneration occurs because of microglial hyperplasia and astroglial hypertrophy, activities that are lacking in the central axotomy response.

=== Central (intrinsic) ===
In contrast to the peripheral response, the axotomy response in central neurons (neurons in the central nervous system) almost always leads to cell death. The mode of cell death is often apoptosis. Central neurons, upon being severed, generally fail to up-regulate the expression of trophic factors, a type of regeneration-associated protein. These trophic factors are responsible for the regulation of neuron vitality and are a critical aspect of neuroprotection. Trophic factors guarantee the survival of neuron synapsing, meaning they essentially maintain the functionality of the neuron. The lack of increased expression of these proteins will ultimately lead to cellular atrophy.

== Surgical axotomy ==
Laser axotomy is a technique under development that allows for precise axon severing. The operation was performed on C. elegans, and neuroregeneration was examined. A 2023 study operated on human and mice cells in vitro.

== Associated injuries and pathologies ==
Although many times axotomy occurs due to intended surgical treatment, it is also often directly related to one of many pathologies/injuries. The following is a preliminary list of some of the known associated injuries and pathologies.

=== Multiple sclerosis ===
Multiple sclerosis is a disease that demyelinates the nerves of the central nervous system, leading to deteriorated bodily function. The underlying pathologies are mostly unknown and not understood. It is hypothesized by many that the demyelination in multiple sclerosis lesions leads to axonal transection and ultimately axonal degeneration. This axon death could potentially be the cause of the irreversible effects of multiple sclerosis. Using what is known about the axotomy response, doctors and researchers are looking to implement neuro-protective rehabilitation to patients in the early stages of multiple sclerosis in order to prevent the disease from running its course and causing irreversible disability. These rehabilitations would include the utilization of trophic factors to aid in neuron survival and maintenance of synapsing function.

=== Traumatic brain injuries ===
A traumatic brain injury is defined as a blunt non-missile penetrating or missile injury to the head. It has been shown that the extent of the damage incurred after a head trauma correlates more directly with the amount of deformation incurred by the brain than the amount of stress per area applied to the head. There are two modes of axotomy that can occur as a result of a TBI. Primary axotomy occurs immediately and is characterized as complete mechanical transection of axons. More often, secondary axotomy occurs, evolving over time and ultimately leading to disconnection. While this type of injury is often irreversible, the axons do occasionally recover. Researchers are currently working towards utilizing this potential for recovery to develop therapies for patients with traumatic brain injuries. These therapies rely on the scientific understanding of the axotomy response. Two mechanisms that aid in the reinnervation process are acute inflammation and the activation of molecules in the extracellular matrix surrounding the synapse. Immediate acute inflammation leads to the removal of the severed axons by activating the local glia. The inflammation response also recruits growth factors that aid in the repopulation of postsynaptic sites. The negative effects of this inflammation may be difficult to detect immediately post injury. Inflammation of the head is often slow to onset after injury, and can lead to a fatal rise in cerebral pressure. A recently discovered and understood cytokine is currently being used to try to treat the axotomy before the rise in pressure occurs. This cytokine, called osteopontin, may be able to aid in axon regeneration by exposing its integrin receptor binding sites. Osteopontin secretion may be able to regulate synaptogenesis and target the necessary neuroglia required for the repair of the axons. A study done by Julie L. Chan proves the functionality of osteopontin in initiating the immune response necessary for synaptic repair and reorganization after injury (axotomy). Though the study effectively proved the functionality of osteopontin in diminishing the intense inflammatory response following a traumatic brain injury, it did not provide evidence of the long-term effects of implanting this as a treatment option. Altering the inflammatory response may unintentional halt the beneficial aspects of inflammation and have devastating effects on the brain's ability to heal itself.

== See also ==
- Diffuse axonal injury
- Neurectomy
- Neurosurgery
- Wallerian degeneration
