= Elisabeth Binder =

Austrian psychiatrist

- Born: Vienna, Austria
- Education: MD, University of Vienna; PhD in Neuroscience, Emory University
- Known for: Translational research, psychiatric genetics, clinical neuroscience
- Awards: Theodore Reich Award (ISPG), Max Hamilton Award (CINP); Carus-Preis (2017)
- Scientific career
- Fields: Neuroscience
- Institutions: Max Planck Institute of Psychiatry, Munich, Germany

Elisabeth Binder is a medical doctor and neuroscientist specializing in the study of mood and anxiety disorders. She is the director of the Department of Translational Research of the Max Planck Institute of Psychiatry in Munich, Germany. In addition to research, she serves as Vice-President of the European College of Neuropsychopharmacology (ECNP) and is a member of the Executive Committee.

== Career ==
=== Education ===
Binder received her MD from the University of Vienna (1995) and completed her PhD in Neuroscience at Emory University in Atlanta, Georgia (2000). Since 2004, she has been an associate professor in the Department of Psychiatry and Behavioral Sciences at Emory University School of Medicine. In 2007 she became a research group leader at the Max Planck Institute of Psychiatry in Munich, Germany. Since 2013 she has been the Director of the Department of Translational Research in Psychiatry of the Institute.

=== Research focus/interests ===
As Director of Translational Research in Psychiatry, her major research focus is the identification of mechanisms by which genetic variants and environmental exposure interact to influence stress reactivity and, through these, the risk for affective and anxiety disorders. The ultimate goal of her research is to improve treatment options for patients by better understanding the underlying disease mechanisms.

=== Awards ===
Binder has been awarded the Theodore Reich Young Investigator Award, given by the International Society of Psychiatric Genetics and the Max Hamilton Award, bestowed upon scientists who have made outstanding contributions to the field, awarded by the International College of Neuropsychopharmacology (CINP).

In 2016 she became a member of the German Academy of Sciences Leopoldina.

=== Positions of trust and research assessments ===
Binder is a member of Munich Center for Neurosciences as well as an associate faculty member of Graduate School of Systemic Neurosciences at LMU Munich. She also serves as Vice-President of the European College of Neuropsychopharmacology (ECNP) and is a member of its Executive Committee.

== Publications ==
Binder has published extensively.

Key publications:

- Mehta, Divya; Klengel, Torsten; Conneely, Karen N.; Smith, Alicia K.; Altmann, André; Pace, Thaddeus W.; Rex-Haffner, Monika; Loeschner, Anne; Gonik, Mariya; Mercer, Kristina B.; Bradley, Bekh; Müller-Myhsok, Bertram; Ressler, Kerry J.; Binder, Elisabeth B. (14 May 2013). "Childhood maltreatment is associated with distinct genomic and epigenetic profiles in posttraumatic stress disorder" (PDF). PNAS. 110 (20). National Academy of Sciences: 8302–8307. Bibcode:2013PNAS..110.8302M. doi:10.1073/pnas.1217750110. PMC 3657772. PMID 23630272.
- Klengel, Torsten; Mehta, Divya; Anacker, Christoph; Rex-Haffner, Monika; Pruessner, Jens C.; Pariante, Carmine M.; Pace, Thaddeus W. W.; Mercer, Kristina B.; Mayberg, Helen S.; Bradley, Bekh; Nemeroff, Charles B.; Holsboer, Florian; Heim, Christine M.; Ressler, Kerry J.; Rein, Theo; Binder, Elisabeth B. (2013). "Allele-specific FKBP5 DNA demethylation mediates gene–childhood trauma interactions". Nature Neuroscience. 16 (1). Nature Publishing Group: 33–41. doi:10.1038/nn.3275. PMC 4136922. PMID 23201972.
- Mehta, Divya; Gonik, Mariya; Klengel, Torsten; Rex-Haffner, Monika; Menke, Andreas; Rubel, Jennifer; Mercer, Kristina B.; Pütz, Benno; Bradley, Bekh; Holsboer, Florian; Ressler, Kerry J.; Müller-Myhsok, Bertram; Binder, Elisabeth B. (September 2011). "Polymorphisms in FKBP5 define biologically distinct subtypes of PTSD: evidence from endocrine and gene expression studies". Arch Gen Psychiatry. 68 (9): 901–910. doi:10.1001/archgenpsychiatry.2011.50. PMC 3686481. PMID 21536970.
- Binder, Elisabeth B.; Bradley, Rebekah G.; Liu, Wei; Epstein, Michael P.; Deveau, Todd C.; Mercer, Kristina B.; Tang, Yilang; Gillespie, Charles F.; Heim, Christine M.; Nemeroff, Charles B.; Schwartz, Ann C.; Cubells, Joseph F.; Ressler, Kerry J. (28 March 2008). "Association of FKBP5 polymorphisms and childhood abuse with risk of Posttraumatic Stress Disorder symptoms in adults". JAMA. 299 (11): 1291–305. doi:10.1001/jama.299.11.1291. PMC 2441757. PMID 18349090.
