= Chromatolysis =

Dissolution of a neuron's Nissl bodies

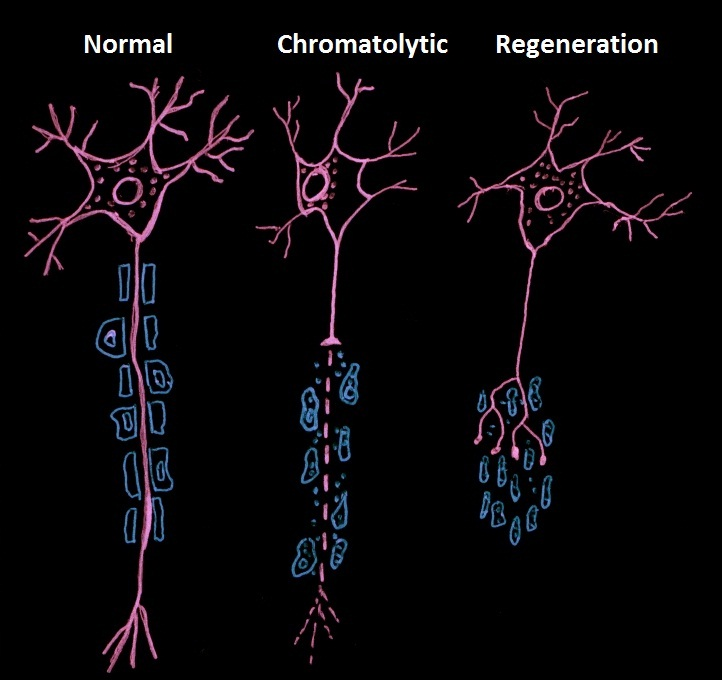
This drawing compares a normal neuron to one undergoing chromatolysis after axonal injury. Regeneration after axonal injury may occur.

In cellular neuroscience, chromatolysis is the dissolution of the Nissl bodies in the cell body of a neuron. It is an induced response of the cell usually triggered by axotomy, ischemia, toxicity to the cell, cell exhaustion, virus infections, and hibernation in lower vertebrates. Neuronal recovery through regeneration can occur after chromatolysis, but most often it is a precursor of apoptosis. The event of chromatolysis is also characterized by a prominent migration of the nucleus towards the periphery of the cell and an increase in the size of the nucleolus, nucleus, and cell body. The term "chromatolysis" was initially used in the 1940s to describe the observed form of cell death characterized by the gradual disintegration of nuclear components, a process which is now called apoptosis. Chromatolysis is still used as a term to distinguish the particular apoptotic process in the neuronal cells, where Nissl substance disintegrates.

== History ==
In 1885, researcher Walther Flemming described dying cells in degenerating mammalian ovarian follicles. The cells showed variable stages of pyknotic chromatin. These stages included chromatin condensation, which Flemming described as "half-moon" shaped and appearing as "chromatin balls," or structures resembling large, smooth, and round electron-dense chromatin masses. Other stages included cell fractionation into smaller bodies. Flemming named this degenerative process "chromatolysis" to describe the gradual disintegration of nuclear components. The process he described now fits with the relatively new term, apoptosis, to describe cell death.

Around the same time of Flemming's research, chromatolysis was also studied in the lactating mammary glands and in breast cancer cells. From observing the regression of ovarian follicles in mammals, it was argued that a necessary cellular process existed to counterbalance the proliferation of cells by mitosis. At this time, chromatolysis was proposed to play a major role in this physiological process. Chromatolysis was also thought to be responsible for necessary cell elimination in various organs during development. Again, these expanded definitions of chromatolysis are consistent with what we now term apoptosis.

In 1952, research further supported the role of chromatolysis in changing the physiology of cells during cell death processes in embryo development. It was also observed that the integrity of mitochondria is maintained during chromatolysis.

By the 1970s, the conserved structural features of chromatolysis were identified. The consistent features of chromatolysis included the condensation of the cytoplasm and chromatin, cell shrinkage, formation of "chromatin balls," intact normal organelles, and fragmentation of cells observed by the budding of fragments enclosed in the cell membrane. These budding fragments were termed "apoptotic bodies," thus coining the name "apoptosis" to describe this form of cell death. The authors of these studies, most likely unfamiliar with older publications on chromatolysis, were essentially describing apoptosis as a process identical to chromatolysis.

== Types of chromatolysis ==
A high magnification micrograph of the anterior horn of the spinal cord showing motoneurons with central chromatolysis visualized using hematoxylin and eosin staining. The chromatolytic cells in the image are those that appear swollen and are missing dark purple substance in the interior.

=== Central chromatolysis ===
Central chromatolysis is the most common form of chromatolysis and is characterized by the loss or dispersion of the Nissl bodies starting near the nucleus at the center of the neuron, and then extending peripherally towards the plasma membrane. Also characteristic of central chromatolysis is the displacement of the nucleus towards the periphery of the perikaryon. Other cellular changes are observed during the process of the central chromatolysis. The process of Nissl dissolution is less apparent toward periphery of the cell body of the neuron, where normal-looking Nissl bodies may be present. Hyperplasia of neurofilaments is frequently observed, however the extent varies. The number of autophagic vacuoles and lysosomal structures often increase during central chromatolysis. Changes can also occur in other organelles such as the Golgi apparatus and neurotubules. However, the exact significance of these changes is currently unknown. In neurons receiving axonal transection, central chromatolysis is observed in the area between the nucleus and the axon hillock following.

=== Peripheral chromatolysis ===
Peripheral chromatolysis is much less common, but has been reported to occur after axotomy and ischemia in certain species. Peripheral chromatolysis is essentially the reverse of central chromatolysis, in which the disintegration of Nissl bodies is initiated at the periphery of the neuron and extends inwards towards the nucleus of the cell. Peripheral chromatolysis has been observed to occur in lithium-induced chromatolysis and it could be useful in investigating and countering the hypothesis that waves of enzymatic activity always progress from the perinuclear area, or the area situated around the nucleus, to the peripheral of the cell.

== Causes ==
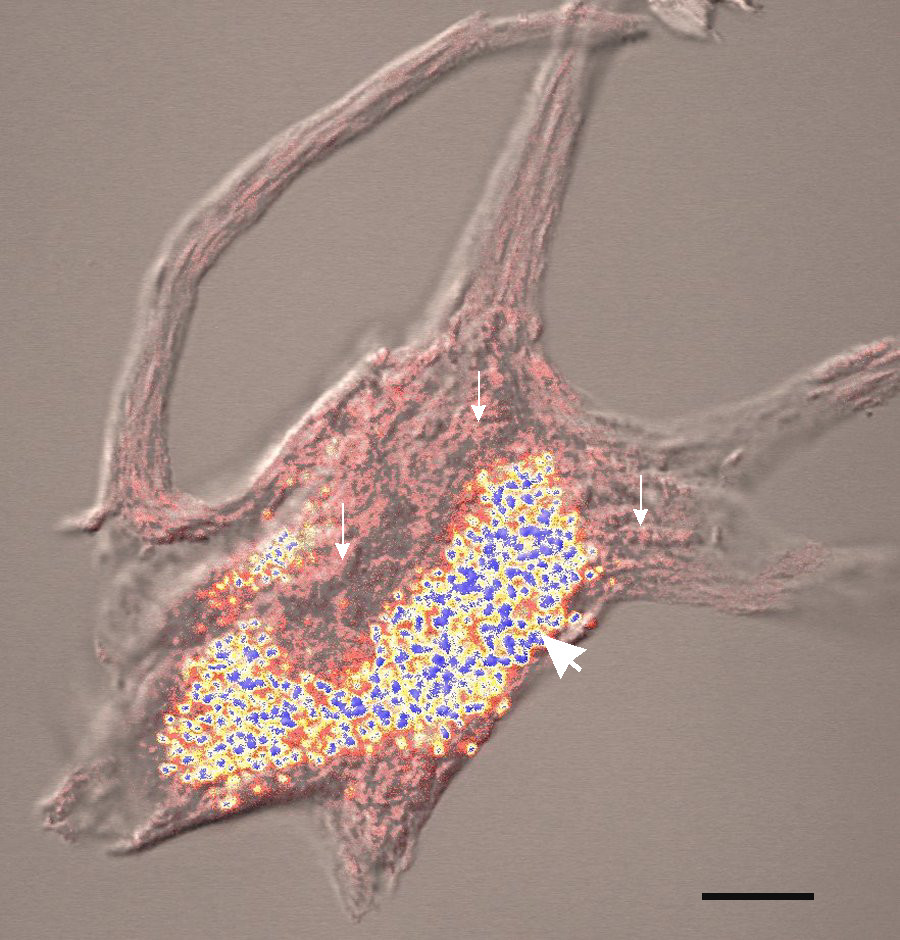
An image of an axotomized spinal motor neuron with Nissl bodies and lipofuscin. The pink structures are Nissl bodies and the blue and yellow structures are the lipofuscin granules. In chromatolysis of motor neurons, these pink structures dissolve.

=== Axotomy ===
When an axon is injured, the whole neuron reacts to provide increased metabolic activity that is necessary for regeneration of the axon. Part of this reaction includes structural alternations caused by the chromatolysis event. The enlargement of nuclear components due to axotomy can be explained by the alteration of the cell's cytoskeleton. The cytoskeleton maintains the nuclear components of a cell and the size of the cell body in neurons. The increase in protein within the neuron leads to this change in the cytoskeleton. For example, there is an increase in phosphorylated neurofilament proteins and cytoskeletal components, tubulin and actin, in neurons undergoing chromatolysis. The increase in protein can be explained by the increase in cytoskeleton size. Changes in the cell body cytoskeleton seem to be responsible for enhanced nuclear eccentricity following axonal injury.

One hypothesis behind the incidence of chromatolysis following axotomy is that the shortening of the axon prevents the incorporation of the axonal cytoskeleton that undergoes formation in the injured neuron. Nuclear eccentricity can be attributed to the presence of excess axonal cytoskeleton between the nucleus and axon hillock, which causes chromatolysis. A second hypothesis proposes that blockage of axonal cytoskeletal proteins causes chromatolysis.

Axotomy also induces the loss of basophilic staining in the event of central chromatolysis of the neuronal cell. The loss of staining begins near the nucleus and spreads toward the axon hillock. The basophilic rim is formed as chromatolysis compresses the cytoplasmic skeleton.

=== Acrylamide intoxication ===
Acrylamide intoxication has been shown to be an agent for the induction of chromatolysis. In one study groups of rats were injected with acrylamide for 3, 6, and 12 days and the A- and B-cell perikarya of their L5 dorsal root ganglion were examined. There was no morphological change in the B-cell perikarya, the A-cell perikarya however exhibited chromatolysis in 11% and 23% of the population, for the 6 and 12 days groups respectively. For the purposes of the study A-cells were defined as ganglia neurons whose nucleolus was large and centrally placed in the nucleus, while B-cells had many nucleoli distributed along the periphery of their nucleus. Acrylamide intoxication resembles neural axotomy histologically and mechanically. In each case the neuron undergoes chromatolysis and atrophy of the cell body and axon. Also both seem to be mechanically related to a disruption of the delivery of neurofilament to the axon due to a decreased transport of a trophic factor from the axon to the cell body.

=== Lithium ===
Exposure to lithium has also been used as a method to induce chromatolysis in rats. The study involved the injection of large doses of lithium chloride into female Lewis rats over several day periods. Examination of the trigeminal and dorsal root ganglia revealed peripheral chromatolysis in these cells. The cells exhibited decreased numbers of Nissl bodies throughout the cell, especially at the peripheral cytoplasm were the Nissl bodies were completely absent. Using lithium as a method to induce peripheral chromatolysis could be useful for future study of chromatolysis due to its simplicity and the fact it does not cause nuclear displacement.

== Associated diseases ==
=== Amyotrophic lateral sclerosis (ALS) ===
Central chromatolysis has been observed in spinal anterior horn and motor neurons of patients with amyotrophic lateral sclerosis (ALS). Patients with ALS appear to have significant alterations that occur within the chromatolyzed neuronal cells. These alterations include dense conglomerates of aggregated dark mitochondria and presynaptic vesicles, bundles of neurofilaments, and a marked increase of presynaptic vesicles. Changes to the function of the motor neurons have also been observed. The most typical functional change in chromatolytic motor neurons is the significant reduction in size of the monosynaptic excitatory postsynaptic potentials (EPSPs). These monosynaptic EPSPs also seem to be prolonged in the chromatolyzed cells of ALS patients. This functional change to the anterior horn neurons could result in the elimination of certain excitatory synaptic inputs and thus give rise to the clinical motor function impairment that is characteristic of the ALS disease.

=== Alzheimer's disease and Pick's disease ===
Alzheimer's disease is a major neurodegenerative disease that involves the dying off of neurons and synapses. Chromatolysis has been observed in neurons from Alzheimer's patients, often as a precursor to apoptosis. Chromatolytic cells have also been observed in a pathologically similar disease known as Pick's disease. Most recent studies have observed chromatolysis in cells from rats that have been subjected to either copper or aluminum toxication, which are both hypothesized to be involved in the pathogenesis of Alzheimer's disease.

=== Idiopathic brainstem neuronal chromatolysis ===
Severe neuronal chromatolysis has been detected in the brainstems of adult cattle with the neurodegenerative condition known as idiopathic brainstem neuronal chromatolysis (IBNC). The symptoms of IBNC in cattle are clinically similar to those characterized by bovine spongiform encephalopathy, otherwise known as mad-cow disease. These symptoms included tremor, lack of muscle movement coordination, anxiety and weight loss. At the cellular level, IBNC is marked by the degeneration of neurons and axons within the brainstem and cranial nerves. The disease also has a significant correlation with abnormal labeling for prion protein (PrP) in the brain. IBNC has been characterized by severe neuronal, axonal, and myelin degradation, accompanied by non-supportive inflammation and changes in spongiform of various regions of grey matter. A significant loss of neurons due to hippocampal degeneration has also been observed. The degenerate chromatolysis neurons seldom showed intracytoplasmic labeling for PrP.

=== Alcoholic encephalopathy ===
Chromatolysis has been reported in patients with alcoholic encephalopathies. Central chromatolysis was observed mainly among neurons in the brainstem, particularly in the pontine nuclei and the cerebellar dentate nuclei. Nuclei of cranial nerves, arcuate nuclei, and posterior horn cells were also affected. Studies examining patients with alcoholic encephalopathies give evidence of central chromatolysis. Mild to severe degeneration of spinal cord tracks has been observed in patients with Marchiafava–Bignami disease and Wernicke–Korsakoff syndrome, both forms of encephalopathy linked to alcohol.

== Future research ==
The mechanisms and signals for chromatolysis were first researched in depth in the 1960s and still merit further investigation. It is clear that axotomy is one of the most direct inducers of chromatolysis and if further research were put into elucidating the specific pathways which associate axonal damage to chromatolysis, then potential therapies could be developed for halting the chromatolytic response of neurons and ameliorating the detrimental effects of degenerative diseases, such as Alzheimer's and ALS.
