= Luxol fast blue stain =

Stain used in biology

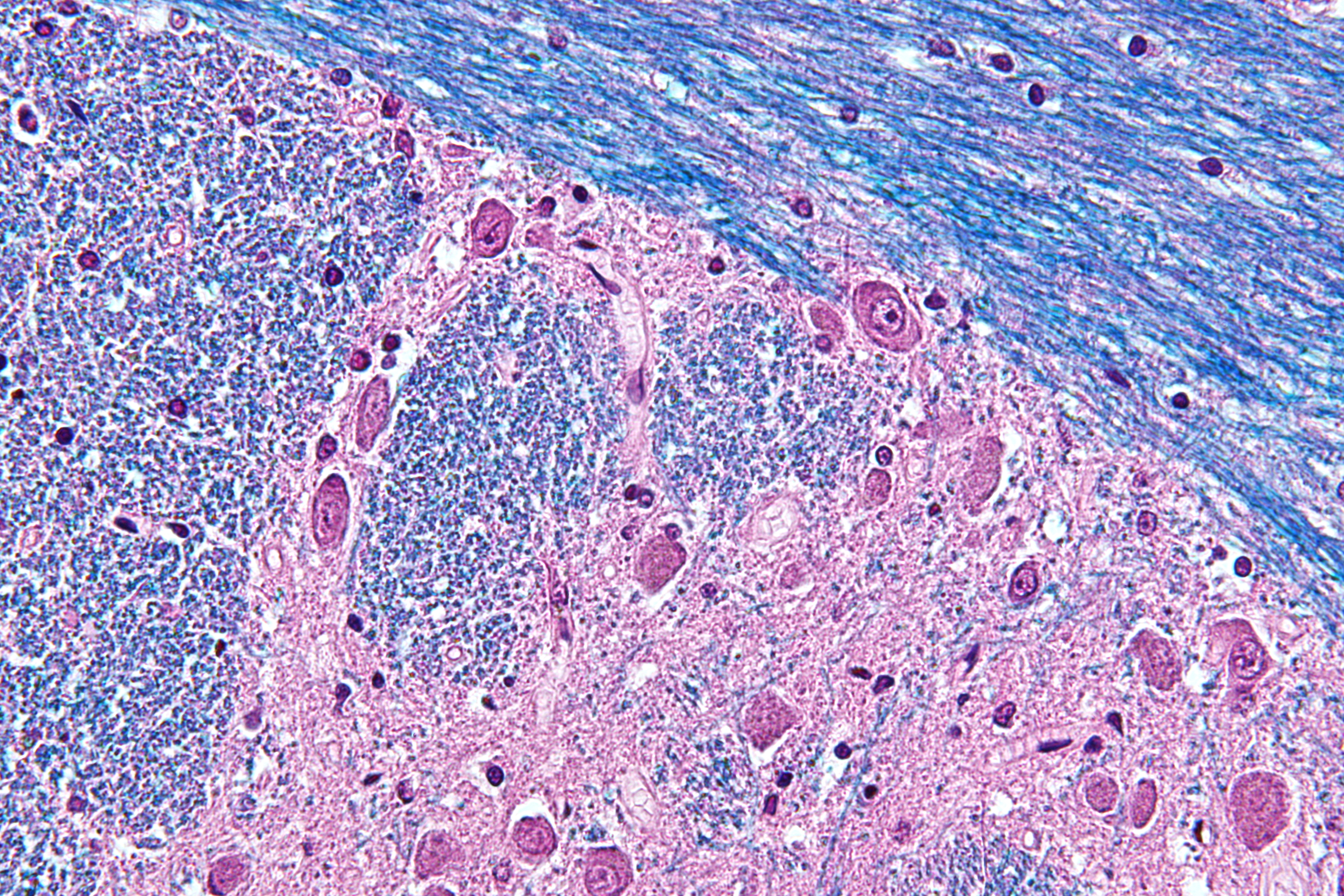
Micrograph of the pons using a hematoxylin & eosin-luxol fast blue stain.

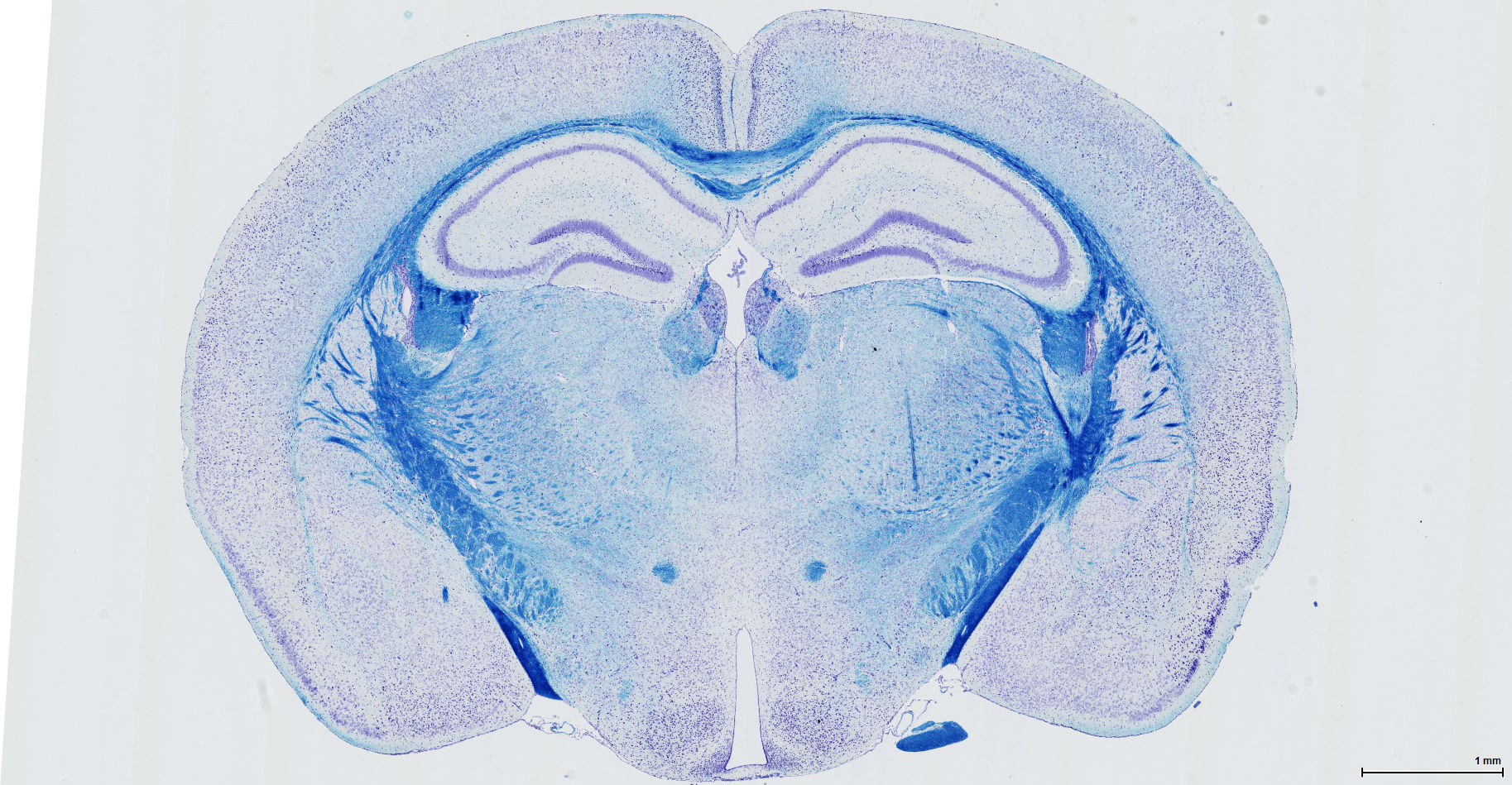
Coronal section of a mouse brain stained with Hematoxylin & LFB

Luxol fast blue stain, abbreviated LFB stain or simply LFB, is a commonly used stain to observe myelin under light microscopy, first developed by Heinrich Klüver and Elizabeth Barrera in 1953. Luxol fast blue refers to one of a group of three chemically and histologically similar dyes. LFB is commonly used to detect demyelination in the central nervous system (CNS), but cannot well discern myelination in the peripheral nervous system.

== History ==
Luxol fast blue dyes were produced by DuPont since at least 1944. Luxol refers to the original trade name used first by DuPont, and later, the Rohm & Haas division of Dow Chemical. Du Pont produced three blue dyes sold under the Luxol trade name, in addition to various other "fast" dyes. The first method of using a luxol fast blue was described by Klüver and Barrera in 1953.

== Types and Chemical Structure ==
There are three types of luxol fast blue: luxol fast blue MBS, luxol fast blue ARN, and luxol fast blue G. LFB MBS is the original and most widely used luxol stain, and was the stain used by Klüver and Barrera. Researchers have since developed similar stain protocols using luxol fast blue ARN.

LFB MBS is the bis[1,3-di(2-tolyl)guanidinium] salt of a copper phthalocyanine-disulfonic acid. The chemical formula for the MBS dye is $\ce{C32H14CuN8Na2O6S2}$; the acid, known as luxol fast blue MBS free acid, has the chemical formula $\ce{[C32H16CuN8O6S2]^2-}$. LFB MBS is a phthalocyanine dye. LFB ARN and LFB G, by contrast, are diarylguanidine salts of sulphonated azo dyes. LFB ARN is better known as anazolene sodium, with the chemical formula $\ce{C26H16N3Na3O10S3}$. LFB G has the formula $\ce{C57H46N10O13S4}$.

== Mechanism of action ==
Luxol fast blue is used primarily to stain the myelin sheaths of neurons. Luxol fast blues undergoes an acid-base reaction to bind to the bases of phospholipids; while the exact bases involved are unknown, previous research has shown strong affinities towards the phospholipids phosphotidyl choline, phosphotidyl ethanolamine, phosphotidyl serine, and sphingomyelin. Together, these phosphoglycerides make up 27.6% of the dry weight of isolated myelin. The various luxol fast blues are histologically similar, with only minor variations in affinity towards certain phospholipids.

== Procedure ==
In the staining procedure, tissue sections are stained with a solution consisting of one of the luxol fast blues and ethanol (sometimes, glacial acetic acid is added). There are two main LFB staining protocols: conventional LFB staining and the MCOLL protocol, and are primarily performed on paraffin sections.

A typical conventional LFB staining is performed as follows:

1. Dewax sections in xylene.
2. Hydrate sections several times, alternating pure ethanol and 95% alcohol.
3. Stain sections for at least 16–24 hours at around 56 °C.
4. Rinse (or immerse) in 95% alcohol at least once, then rinse once in distilled water.
5. Differentiate in 0.05% lithium carbonate.
6. Continue differentiation in changes of 70% alcohol until grey and white matter can be distinguished.
7. Wash in distilled water.
8. (if necessary, continue differentiation with several changes of 70% alcohol).
9. Stop differentiation in distilled water.
10. Rinse or immerse in multiple changes of 95% alcohol.
11. (if necessary, rinse or immerse in multiple changes of pure ethanol).
12. Transfer to xylene.
13. Mount slides.

In the MCOLL protocol, the following steps are added after differentiation is stopped, and before the transfer to xylene and mounting:

1. Rinse in distilled water.
2. Stain sections in picro-sirius red solution at room temperature for 30 minutes.
3. Rinse in multiple changes of distilled water.
4. Counterstain with Harris' hematoxylin for 3 minutes.
5. Rinse in tap water for 3–5 minutes.
6. Dehydrate in successively increasing concentrations of ethanol from 70% (or 95%) to 99%.

In pure LFB stains, myelin fibers appear blue, with areas of the highest concentration of myelin appearing darker. The blue stain appears on a white background.

Typically, cresyl violet is used as counterstain. Cresyl violet binds to Nissl substance, which is concentrated around a neural cell's nucleus; such a counterstain allows differentiation between myelenated axons, cell bodies, and unmyelenated axons or glial cells. In such a stain, myelin fibers appear blue, neuropil appears pink (or faint purple), and neuron cell bodies appear purple.

== Other combination methods ==
Though the typical counterstain for LFB staining is cresyl violet, LFB protocols are frequently combined with other common staining methods. The combination of LFB with counterstain or other staining methods provides the most useful and reliable method for the demonstration of pathological processes in the CNS. After cresyl violet, LFB is most often combined with H&E stain (hematoxylin and eosin), which is abbreviated H-E-LFB, H&E-LFB. Other common staining methods include the periodic acid-Schiff, Oil Red O, phosphotungstic acid, and Holmes silver nitrate method.

== See also ==
- Bielschowsky stain
