= Karl Jaspers =

German-Swiss psychiatrist and philosopher (1883–1969)

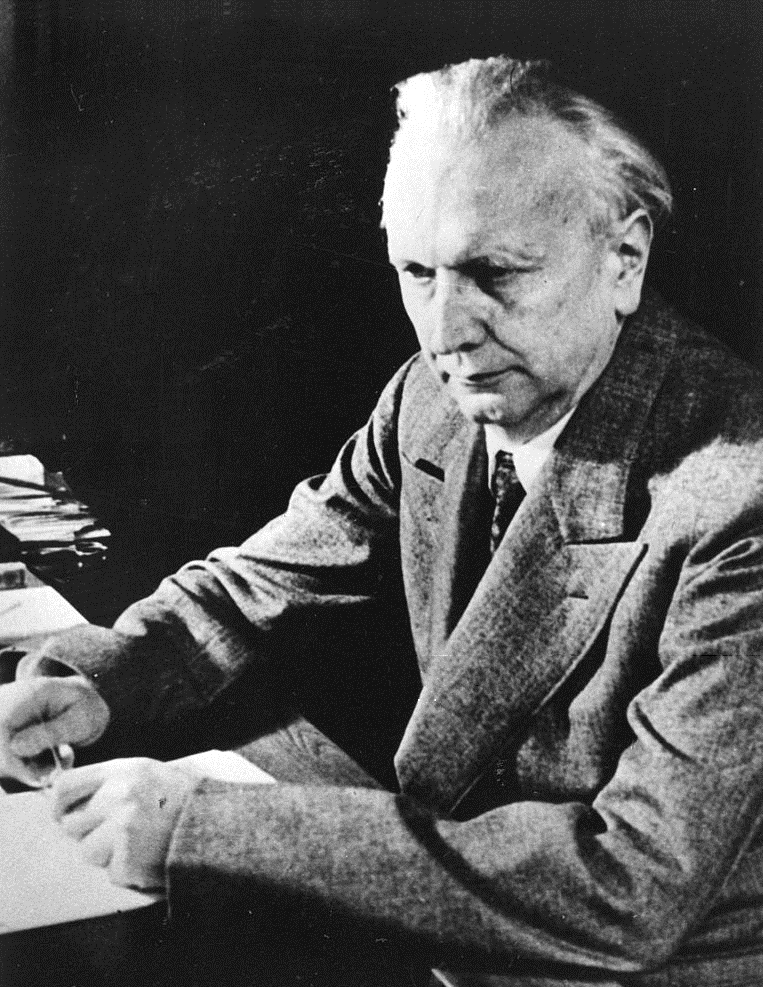
- Jaspers in 1946
- Born: 23 February 1883; Oldenburg, Germany
- Died: 26 February 1969 (aged 86); Basel, Switzerland
- Spouse: Gertrud Mayer (m. 1910)

Education
- Education: Heidelberg University (MD, 1908)
- Doctoral advisor: Franz Nissl

Philosophical work
- Era: 20th-century philosophy
- Region: Western philosophy
- School: Neo-Kantianism (early); Existentialism (late); Existential phenomenology (late)
- Institutions: Heidelberg University; University of Basel
- Doctoral students: Hannah Arendt; Alexandre Kojève
- Main interests: Psychiatry, theology, philosophy of history
- Notable ideas: Axial Age, coining the term Existenzphilosophie, Dasein and Existenz as the two states of being, subject–object split (Subjekt-Objekt-Spaltung), theory of communicative transcendence, limit situation

Karl Theodor Jaspers (/ˈjɑːspərz/; German: [kaʁl ˈjaspɐs]; 23 February 1883 – 26 February 1969) was a German-Swiss psychiatrist and philosopher who had a strong influence on modern theology, psychiatry, and philosophy. His 1913 work General Psychopathology influenced many later diagnostic criteria, and argued for a distinction between "primary" and "secondary" delusions.

After being trained in and practising psychiatry, Jaspers turned to philosophical inquiry and attempted to develop an innovative philosophical system. He was often viewed as a major exponent of existentialism in Germany, though he did not accept the label.

== Life ==
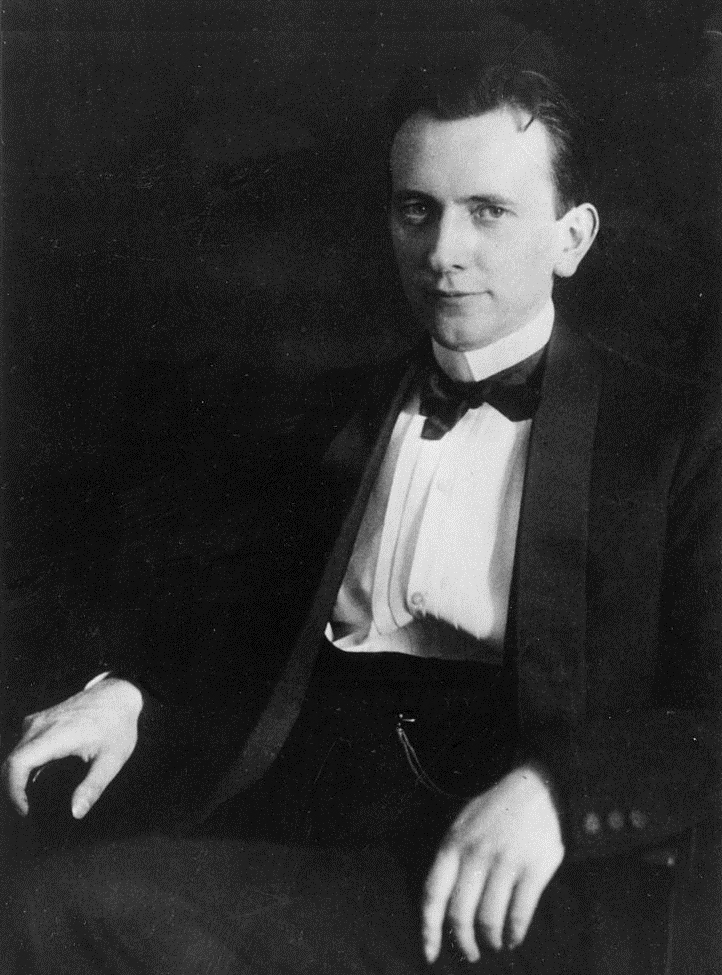
Karl Jaspers in 1910

Jaspers was born in Oldenburg in 1883 to a mother from a local farming community and a jurist father. He showed an early interest in philosophy, but his father's experience with the legal system influenced his decision to study law at Heidelberg University. Jaspers first studied law at Heidelberg and later at the Ludwig-Maximilians-Universität München for three semesters. It soon became clear that Jaspers did not particularly enjoy law, and he switched to studying medicine in 1902 with a thesis about criminology. In 1910, he married Gertrud Mayer (1879–1974), the sister of his close friends Gustav Mayer and Ernst Mayer.

Jaspers earned his medical doctorate from the Heidelberg University medical school in 1908 and began work at a psychiatric hospital in Heidelberg under Franz Nissl, the successor of Emil Kraepelin and Karl Bonhoeffer, and Karl Wilmans. Jaspers became dissatisfied with the way the medical community of the time approached the study of mental illness and gave himself the task of improving the psychiatric approach. In 1913 Jaspers habilitated at the philosophical faculty of Heidelberg University and gained a post there in 1914 as a psychology teacher. The post later became a permanent philosophical one, and Jaspers never returned to clinical practice. During this time, Jaspers was a close friend of the Weber family (Max Weber also having held a professorship at Heidelberg).

In 1921, at the age of 38, Jaspers turned from psychology to philosophy, expanding on themes he had developed in his psychiatric works. He became a well-known philosopher across Germany and Europe.

After the Nazi seizure of power in 1933, Jaspers was considered to have a "Jewish taint" (jüdische Versippung, in the jargon of the time) due to his Jewish wife, Gertrude Mayer, and was forced to retire from teaching in 1937. In 1938, he fell under a publication ban as well. Many of his long-time friends stood by him, however, and he was able to continue his studies and research without being totally isolated. But he and his wife were under constant threat of removal to a concentration camp until 30 March 1945, when Heidelberg was occupied by American troops.

In 1948, Jaspers moved to the University of Basel in Switzerland. In 1963, he was awarded the honorary citizenship of the city of Oldenburg in recognition of his outstanding scientific achievements and services to occidental culture. He remained prominent in the philosophical community and became a naturalized citizen of Switzerland, living in Basel until his death on his wife's 90th birthday in 1969.

== Contributions to psychiatry ==
Jaspers's dissatisfaction with the popular understanding of mental illness led him to question both the diagnostic criteria and the methods of clinical psychiatry. He published a paper in 1910 in which he addressed the problem of whether paranoia was an aspect of personality or the result of biological changes. Although it did not broach new ideas, this article introduced a rather unusual method of study, at least according to the norms then prevalent. Not unlike Freud, Jaspers studied patients in detail, giving biographical information about the patients as well as notes on how the patients themselves felt about their symptoms. This has become known as the biographical method and now forms a mainstay of psychiatric and, above all, psychotherapeutic practice.

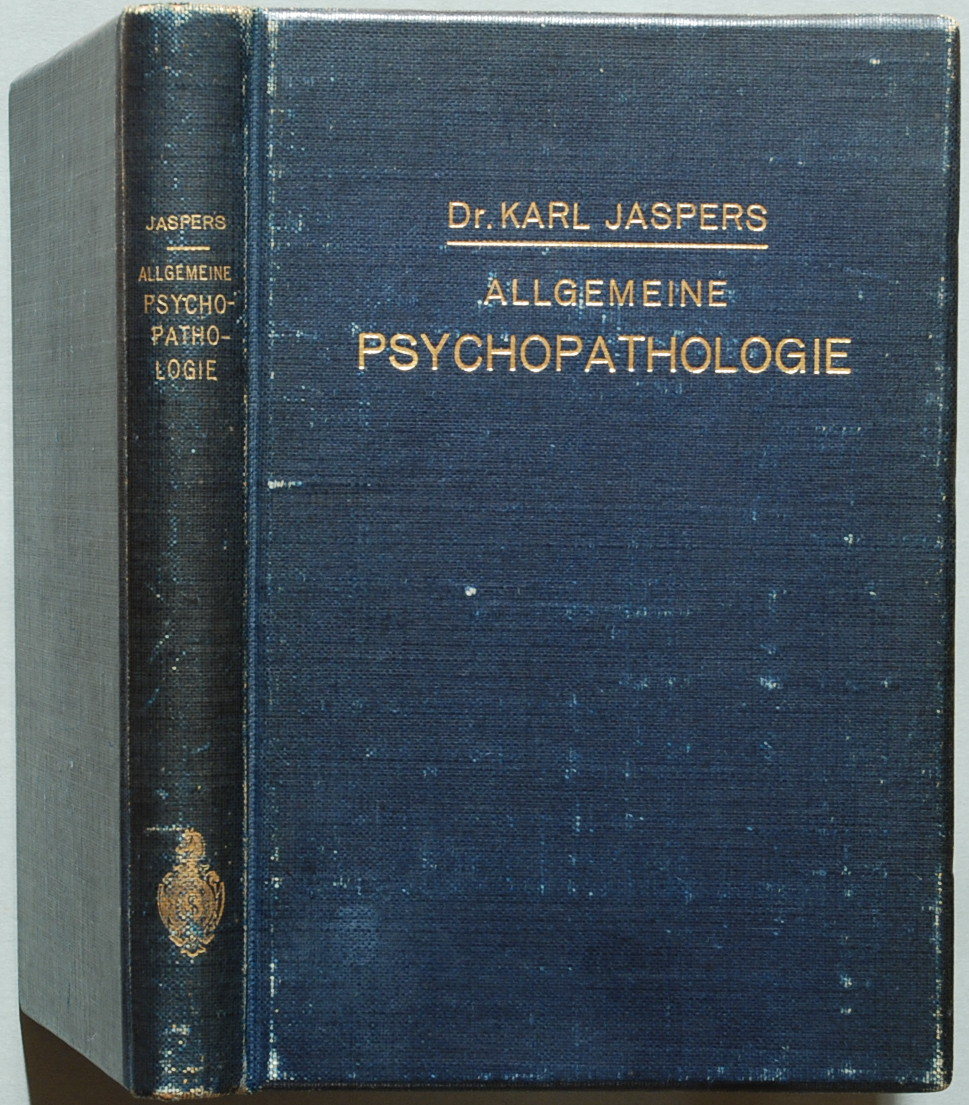
Karl Jaspers: Allgemeine Psychopathologie, first print 1913

Jaspers set down his views on mental illness in a book which he published in 1913, General Psychopathology. This work has become a classic in the psychiatric literature and many modern diagnostic criteria stem from ideas found within it. One of Jaspers's central tenets was that psychiatrists should diagnose symptoms of mental illness (particularly of psychosis) by their form rather than by their content. For example, in diagnosing a hallucination, it is more important to note that a person experiences visual phenomena when no sensory stimuli account for them than to note what the patient sees. What the patient sees is the "content", but the discrepancy between visual perception and objective reality is the "form".

Jaspers thought that psychiatrists could diagnose delusions in the same way. He argued that clinicians should not consider a belief delusional based on the content of the belief, but only based on the way in which a patient holds such a belief. (See delusion for further discussion.) Jaspers also distinguished between primary and secondary delusions. He defined primary delusions as autochthonous, meaning that they arise without apparent cause, appearing incomprehensible in terms of a normal mental process. (This is a slightly different use of the word autochthonous than the ordinary medical or sociological use as a synonym for indigenous.) Secondary delusions, on the other hand, he defined as those influenced by the person's background, current situation or mental state.

Jaspers considered primary delusions to be ultimately "un-understandable" since he believed no coherent reasoning process existed behind their formation. This view has caused some controversy, and the likes of R. D. Laing and Richard Bentall (1999, p. 133–135) have criticised it, stressing that this stance can lead therapists into the complacency of assuming that because they do not understand a patient, the patient is deluded and further investigation on the part of the therapist will have no effect. For instance, Huub Engels (2009) argues that schizophrenic disordered speech may be understandable, just as Emil Kraepelin's dream speech is understandable.

== Contributions to philosophy and theology ==
Most commentators associate Jaspers with the philosophy of existentialism, in part because he draws largely upon the existentialist roots of Nietzsche and Kierkegaard, and in part because the theme of individual freedom permeates his work. In Philosophy (3 vols, 1932), Jaspers gave his view of the history of philosophy and introduced his major themes. Beginning with modern science and empiricism, Jaspers points out that as people question reality, they confront borders that an empirical (or scientific) method simply cannot transcend. At this point, the individual faces a choice: sink into despair and resignation, or take a leap of faith toward what Jaspers calls Transcendence. In making this leap, individuals confront their own limitless freedom, which Jaspers calls Existenz, and can finally experience authentic existence.

Transcendence (paired with the term The Encompassing in later works) is, for Jaspers, that which exists beyond the world of time and space. Jaspers's formulation of Transcendence as ultimate non-objectivity (or no-thing-ness) has led many philosophers to argue that ultimately, Jaspers became a monist, though Jaspers himself continually stressed the necessity of recognizing the validity of the concepts both of subjectivity and of objectivity.

Although he rejected explicit religious doctrines, including the notion of a personal God, Jaspers influenced contemporary theology through his philosophy of transcendence and the limits of human experience. Mystic Christian traditions influenced Jaspers himself tremendously, particularly those of Meister Eckhart and of Nicholas of Cusa. He also took an active interest in Eastern philosophies, particularly Buddhism, and developed the theory of an Axial Age, a period of substantial philosophical and religious development. Jaspers also entered public debates with Rudolf Bultmann, wherein Jaspers roundly criticized Bultmann's "demythologizing" of Christianity.

Jaspers wrote extensively on the threat to human freedom posed by modern science and modern economic and political institutions. During World War II, he had to abandon his teaching post because his wife was Jewish. After the war, he resumed his teaching position, and in his work The Question of German Guilt he unabashedly examined the culpability of Germany as a whole in the atrocities of Hitler's Third Reich. In that work, Jaspers defines metaphysical guilt as each German's citizen's innate responsibility for the acts of Nazi Germany, contrasting this idea of metaphysical guilt with the concepts of legal, political, and moral guilt.

The following quote about the Second World War and its atrocities was used at the end of the sixth episode of the BBC documentary series The Nazis: A Warning from History: "That which has happened is a warning. To forget it is guilt. It must be continually remembered. It was possible for this to happen, and it remains possible for it to happen again at any minute. Only in knowledge can it be prevented."

Jaspers's major works, lengthy and detailed, can seem daunting in their complexity. His last great attempt at a systematic philosophy of Existenz – Von der Wahrheit (On Truth) – has not yet appeared in English. However, he also wrote shorter works, most notably Philosophy Is for Everyman. The two major proponents of phenomenological hermeneutics, namely Paul Ricœur (a student of Jaspers) and Hans-Georg Gadamer (Jaspers's successor at Heidelberg), both display Jaspers's influence in their works.

== Political views ==
Jaspers identified with the liberal political philosophy of Max Weber, although he rejected Weber's nationalism. He valued humanism and cosmopolitanism and, influenced by Immanuel Kant, advocated an international federation of states with shared constitutions, laws, and international courts. He strongly opposed totalitarian despotism and warned about the increasing tendency towards technocracy, or a regime that regards humans as mere instruments of science or of ideological goals. He was also sceptical of majoritarian democracy. Thus, he supported a form of governance that guaranteed individual freedom and limited government, and shared Weber's belief that democracy needed to be guided by an intellectual elite. His views were seen as anti-communist.

== Influences ==
Jaspers held Kierkegaard and Nietzsche to be two of the most important figures in post-Kantian philosophy. In his compilation, The Great Philosophers (Die großen Philosophen), he wrote: "I approach the presentation of Kierkegaard with some trepidation. Next to Nietzsche, or rather, prior to Nietzsche, I consider him to be the most important thinker of our post-Kantian age. With Goethe and Hegel, an epoch had reached its conclusion, and our prevalent way of thinking – that is, the positivistic, natural-scientific one – cannot really be considered as philosophy." Jaspers also questions whether the two philosophers could be taught. For Kierkegaard, at least, Jaspers felt that Kierkegaard's whole method of indirect communication precludes any attempts to properly expound his thought into any sort of systematic teaching.

Though Jaspers was certainly indebted to Kierkegaard and Nietzsche, he also owes much to Kant and Plato. Walter Kaufmann argues in From Shakespeare to Existentialism that, though Jaspers was certainly indebted to Kierkegaard and Nietzsche, he was closest to Kant's philosophy:

Jaspers is too often seen as the heir of Nietzsche and Kierkegaard to whom he is in many ways less close than to Kant ... the Kantian antinomies and Kant's concern with the realm of decision, freedom, and faith have become exemplary for Jaspers. And even as Kant "had to do away with knowledge to make room for faith," Jaspers values Nietzsche in large measure because he thinks that Nietzsche did away with knowledge, thus making room for Jaspers' "philosophic faith".

In his essay "On My Philosophy", Jaspers states: "While I was still at school Spinoza was the first. Kant then became the philosopher for me and has remained so ... Nietzsche gained importance for me only late as the magnificent revelation of nihilism and the task of overcoming it." Jaspers is also indebted to his contemporaries, such as Heinrich Blücher, from whom he borrowed the term, "the anti-political principle" to describe totalitarianism's destruction of a space of resistance.

== Selected bibliography ==
Original German

- Psychologie der Weltanschauungen, 1919.
- Nikolaus Cusanus, 1969.

Translations

- Man in the Modern Age, 1933.
- The Question of German Guilt – New York: Dial Press, 1947.
- Way to Wisdom, 1951 – ISBN 0-300-00134-7.
- The Origin and Goal of History. translated by Michael Bullock. New Haven, CT: Yale University Press. 1953.
- Reason and Existenz. translated by William Earle. New York: Noonday Press. 1955.
- The Future of Mankind. translated by E. B. Ashton. Chicago: University of Chicago Press. 1958.
- Socrates, Buddha, Confucius, Jesus, 1966 – ISBN 0-15-683580-0.
- Philosophy Is for Everyman, 1967.
- Philosophy of Existence – ISBN 0-8122-1010-7, University of Pennsylvania Press, 1971.
- Strindberg and Van Gogh: An Attempt of a Pathographic Analysis with Reference to Parallel Cases of Swedenborg and Holderlin, 1977 – ISBN 0-8165-0608-6.
- General Psychopathology – Volumes 1 & 2. translated by J. Hoenig and Marian W. Hamilton. Baltimore and London: Johns Hopkins University Press. 1997.
- Nietzsche: An Introduction to the Understanding of His Philosophical Activity – ISBN 0-8018-5779-1, Johns Hopkins University Press, 1997 (University of Arizona Press, 1965).
- Reason and Existenz, 1997 – ISBN 0-87462-611-0.

== See also ==
- Definitions of philosophy
