= Felix Plaut =

German psychiatrist

Felix Plaut (1877–1940) was a German psychiatrist who was director of the Department of Serology at the Deutsche Forschungsanstalt für Psychiatrie in Munich. In 1935 he was removed from this position by the Nazis, and subsequently emigrated to London.

Plaut is remembered for his research on the syphilitic origin of general paresis, as well as his work with August von Wassermann (1866-1925) in the development of a serological test for syphilis. Plaut performed extensive research of syphilis and its correlation to psychiatric disorders, and conducted early studies in neuroimmunology involving the brain's immune reaction to syphilitic infiltration.

== Selected writings ==
- "The Wasserman Sero-Diagnosis of Syphilis in its Application to Psychiatry", translated by Smith Ely Jelliffe and Louis Casamajor (1911); originally published in German in 1909 as Die Wassermannsche Serodiagnostik der Syphilis in ihrer Anwendung auf die Psychiatrie.
- Leitfaden zur Untersuchung der Zerebospinalflüssigkeit. Jena: Verlag von Gustav Fischer, (1913). 1st Edition
- 4 Fälle aus der Deutschen Forschungsanstalt für Psychiatrie; with Walther Spielmeyer: In Franz Nissl’s Beiträge, volume 2, 1; Berlin, (1923).
