= Philosophy of Existence =

Book by Karl Jaspers

- Cover of the first edition
- Author: Karl Jaspers
- Language: German
- Subject: History of philosophy
- Published: 1938
- Publication place: Germany

Philosophy of Existence (German: Existenzphilosophie, 1938) is a book by German psychiatrist and philosopher Karl Jaspers. It is both a discussion on the history of philosophy and an exposition of Jaspers' own philosophical system, which is often viewed as a form of existentialism. He put forth concepts such as existence in a minimal and superficial state, "dasein" (the word is also used by Martin Heidegger, but with different meanings), and Existenz, a state of authentic true being, and their relationship with the "encompassing", an elusive being often understood as the totality of consciousness, the world itself, and other forms of determinate objects. Jaspers stressed the importance of transcendence, similar to the term "leap of faith" implied in the works of Søren Kierkegaard.

The English version translated by Richard F. Grabau was published in 1971. It was included in a series of books of Continental Philosophy, edited by John Silber and published by University of Pennsylvania Press.
