= Caroline Boudoux =

Canadian engineer

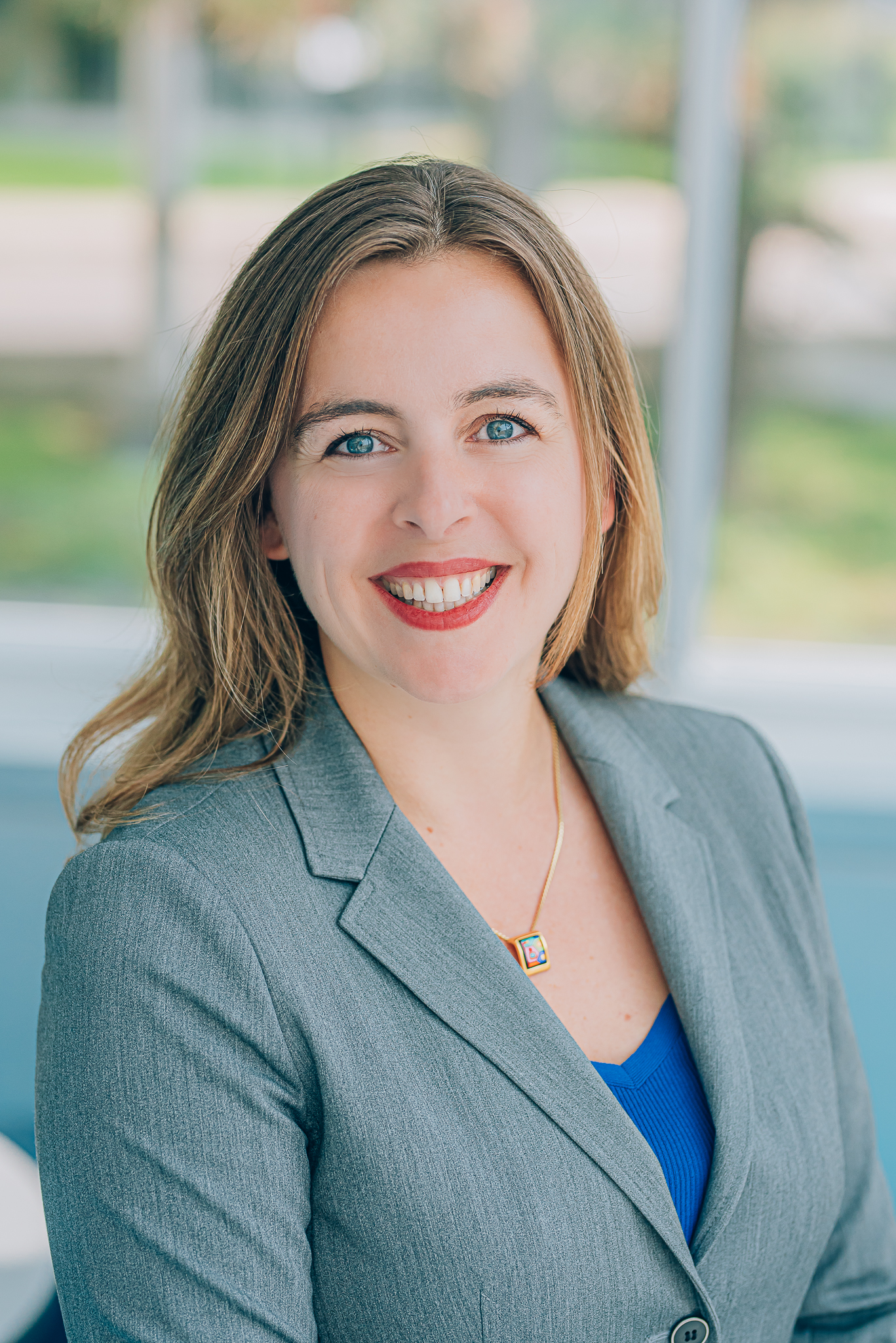

Caroline Boudoux is a Canadian biomedical engineer and optical engineer whose research involves combining lasers and fiber optics to develop tools for medical imaging, including optical coherence tomography and confocal endomicroscopy. She is a professor of engineering physics at Polytechnique Montréal, affiliated with the Centre hospitalier universitaire Sainte-Justine, the Biomedical Engineering Institute of the Université de Montréal, and the Quebec Center for Optics, Photonics, and Lasers.

== Education and career ==
Boudoux is originally from Saint-Nicolas, Quebec; her parents, a forest engineer and a pharmacist and teacher, came to Canada from Belgium. She writes that her interest in biomedical engineering began when she saw an exhibit of Leonardo da Vinci anatomical illustrations, at age five. She has a bachelor's degree from Université Laval and a Ph.D. from the Massachusetts Institute of Technology through the Harvard–MIT Program in Health Sciences and Technology, supervised by Brett Bouma and Guillermo J. Tearney.

Before joining Polytechnique Montréal, she became a postdoctoral researcher in France, at the École polytechnique in Paris, working there with Emmanuel Beaurepaire and Manuel Joffre. She became an assistant professor of engineering physics at Polytechnique Montréal in 2007, and was promoted to full professor in 2018.

She co-founded a spin-off company, Castor Optics, in 2013. She visited Stanford University as a Fulbright Fellow in 2015. She is a member of the board of directors of the Institut National d'Optique and of Optica.

== Books ==
Boudoux is the author of books on engineering including:

- Fundamentals of Biomedical Optics (Pollux, 2017)
- Introduction à la conception en ingénierie (Pollux, 2017)
- Tools of Optics (Pollux, 2019)
- It Goes Without Saying: Taking the Guesswork Out of Your PhD in Engineering (MIT Press, 2024)

== Recognition ==
Boudoux was named as a fellow of SPIE in 2020, and as a 2025 Fellow of Optica. In 2023 the Ordre des ingénieurs du Québec honored her with their "Honoris Genius" award.
