= Carlos Tearney =

American martial artist

Carlos Tearney is an American martial artist from Central New York. He's a nationally recognized karate instructor and 14-time Karate World Champion.

== Martial arts training ==
Tearney started martial arts in 1983 under Greg Tearney, earning his black belt in 1992. He is currently a fourth degree black belt in Okinawan Goju Ryu and holds the title "Renshi" which is a distinction given to Master Instructors holding a fourth degree black belt and higher. He is also a level three instructor in Krav Maga, and has trained in numerous other martial arts systems such as Muay Thai, Eskrima (Filipino stick and knife fighting), Brazilian Jiu-Jitsu, Jeet Kune Do, Harimau and Panantukan.

== NBL World Titles ==
Tearney's World Championships include five individual National Blackbelt League (NBL) World GrandChampionship titles, as well as three Team Titles including:

- 1997 NBL Point Fighting Male Light Heavyweight
- 1998 NBL Point Fighting Male Light Heavyweight
- 1999 NBL Point Fighting Male Heavyweight
- 2000 NBL Point Fighting Male Heavyweight
- 2003 NBL Point Fighting Male Super-Heavyweight
- 2003 Team "Bay Area's Best", with partners Justus Lawrence and Raymond Daniels (martial artist)
- 2009 Team "All Stars", with partners Jack Felton and Raymond Daniels (martial artist)
- 2011 Team "All Stars", with partners Colbey Northcutt and Raymond Daniels (martial artist)

== WKC World Titles ==
Tearney also has three World Karate and Kickboxing Council (WKC) titles, including two individual titles, and one team title:

- 2011 WKC Point Fighting 35+ year, 85+Kg
- 2011 WKC Light Contact Sparring, 35+ year, 85+Kg
- 2011 WKC Team Point Fighting Veteran Men, Team USA-Blue.

== World Combat League ==
Adopting the nickname "Showtime", Tearney participated in season one of Chuck Norris' World Combat League, a full contact, team based kickboxing promotion. Tearney was involved with the WCL for just over a year, and was first part of the Los Angeles Stars before becoming a part of the New York Clash. He participated in four episodes, fighting twice in each and carried a record of 4–4.

== Martial arts instruction ==
Tearney is currently the owner and head instructor of Champions Martial Arts and Fitness which offers training in multiple forms of martial arts as well as combative self-defense and kickboxing based fitness training. He won the International Martial Arts Instructor of the Year award in 1998 and 2003, given by the Educational Funding Company representing over 2000 martial arts schools from all over the world. Tearney also received his certification as a Personal Trainer in 2007 through the W.I.T.S. Personal Training program and incorporates full body fitness into his martial arts instruction.
