= Crypt (anatomy) =

Crypts are anatomical structures that are narrow but deep invaginations into a larger structure.

One common type of anatomical crypt is the Crypts of Lieberkühn. However, it is not the only type: some types of tonsils also have crypts. Because these crypts allow external access to the deep portions of the tonsils, these tonsils are more vulnerable to infection.
