= Guillermo J. Tearney =

American pathologist

Guillermo (Gary) J. Tearney
- Born: June 20, 1966 (age 60); Fontana, CA
- Education: Massachusetts Institute of Technology, PhD; Harvard Medical School, MD
- Known for: optical coherence tomography;
- Scientific career
- Fields: Biomedical Optics; Translational Medicine
- Workplaces: Harvard Medical School; Massachusetts General Hospital
- Doctoral students: Caroline Boudoux

Guillermo J. Tearney is an American pathologist recognized as one of the inventors of Intracoronary optical coherence tomography. His research focuses on translational medicine, developing and moving to clinical use optical imaging methods for disease diagnosis.

He is the Remondi Family Endowed MGH Research Institute Chair and professor of pathology at Harvard Medical School, a physicist in the department of dermatology at the Massachusetts General Hospital, a pathologist in the department of pathology at the Massachusetts General Hospital and runs a research laboratory at the Wellman Center for Photomedicine at the Massachusetts General Hospital in Boston Massachusetts.

== Education ==
Tearney received his BA in applied mathematics, graduating cum laude (1988), his MD graduating magna cum laude (1998) from Harvard Medical School, and received his PhD in electrical engineering (1997) from the Massachusetts Institute of Technology.

== Recognition ==
Tearney was named to the National Academy of Inventors in 2015, and to the American Institute for Medical and Biological Engineering (AIMBE) College of Fellows in 2019, "for pioneering contributions developing, translating, commercializing, and standardizing optical imaging technologies that acquire microscopic imaging from living human patients".
