= Walther Spielmeyer =

German neurologist and pathologist

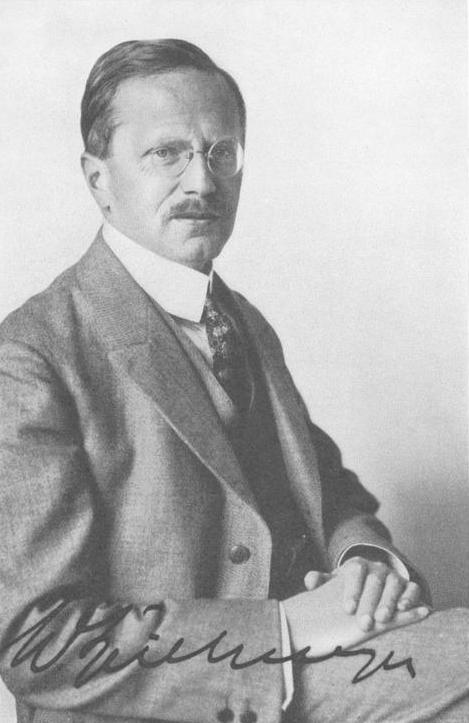
Walther Spielmeyer (1879-1935)

Walther Spielmeyer (23 April 1879 – 6 February 1935) was a German neuropathologist who was a native of Dessau.

== Biography ==
He studied medicine at the University of Halle as a student of Eduard Hitzig (1838-1907). At Halle he was influenced by the work of psychiatrists Karl Heilbronner (1869-1914), Gustav Aschaffenburg (1866-1944) and pathologist Karl Joseph Eberth (1835-1926). In 1906 he relocated to Freiburg as an assistant to Alfred Hoche (1865-1943). At the suggestion of Emil Kraepelin (1856-1926), he succeeded Alois Alzheimer (1864-1915) as director of the Anatomisches Laboratorium der Psychiatrischen und Nervenklinik in Munich. At Munich he worked with Franz Nissl (1860-1919) and Felix Plaut (1877-1940).

In 1928 the Rockefeller Foundation financed the Kaiser Wilhelm Institute with Spielmeyer as director of the Hirnpathologisches Institut. He died of pulmonary tuberculosis on February 6, 1935.

== Research ==
Spielmeyer is remembered for his research of peripheral nervous system injuries as well as his specialized study of disturbed brain function caused by temporary circulation problems. He is credited with making significant contributions involving the function of glia in inflammatory processes and on the pathophysiology of cerebral blood flow in neurological-psychiatric disorders.

He was the author of highly regarded books on the neurohistology and histopathology of the nervous system; "Technik der mikroskopischen Untersuchung des Nervensystems" (1911) and "Histopathologie des Neurvensystems" (1922), the latter work being known for its excellent illustrations. He coined the term "Creutzfeldt–Jakob disease" to refer to a rapidly progressive neurodegenerative disease first described separately by the eponymous German neurologists.

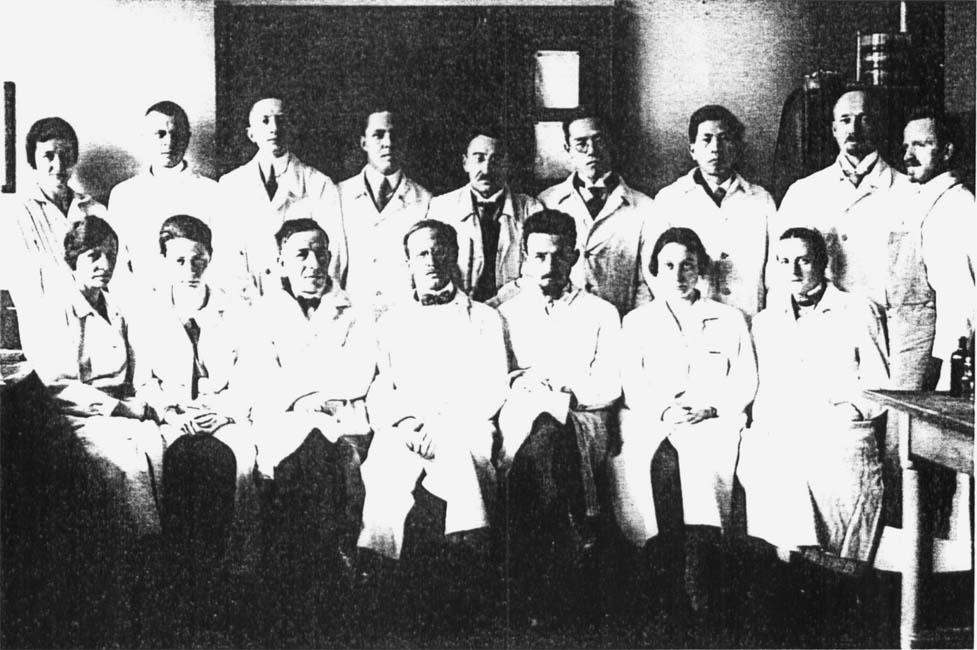
Walther Spielmeyer and his laboratory team at Munich, 1927 (Spielmeyer at center front).

== Associated eponym ==
- Spielmeyer-Vogt disease: A congenital progressive lysosome dysfunction that usually presents itself around the age of five, and is characterized by cerebroretinal degeneration, dementia and early death. Named along with neurologist Heinrich Vogt (1875-1936).

== Selected writings ==
- Die Trypanosomenkrankheiten und ihre Beziehungen zu den syphilogenen Nervenkrankheiten (Trypanosomiasis and its correlation to syphilitic nerve disorders). Jena, Fischer, 1908.
- Technik der mikroskopischen Untersuchung des Nervensystems (Microscopic studies of the nervous system). Berlin, Springer, 1911; 4. Aufl., 1930.
- Die progressive Paralyse. In: Handbuch der Neurologie, Bd. 3; Berlin, 1912.
- Zur Klinik und Anatomie der Nerven-Schussverletzungen. Berlin, Springer, 1915.
- Histopathologie des Nervensystems (Histopathology of the nervous system). Erster Band: Allgemeiner Teil. Berlin, J. Springer, 1922.
- Degeneration und Regeneration am peripherischen Nerven. (Degeneration and regeneration of the peripheral nervous system). Handbuch der normalen und pathologischen Physiologie, Bd. 3; Berlin, 1929.
- Die Anatomie der Psychosen. (Anatomy of psychosis). Handbuch der Geisteskrankheiten, Bd. 11; Berlin, 1930.
