= Franz Nissl =

German psychiatrist and medical researcher

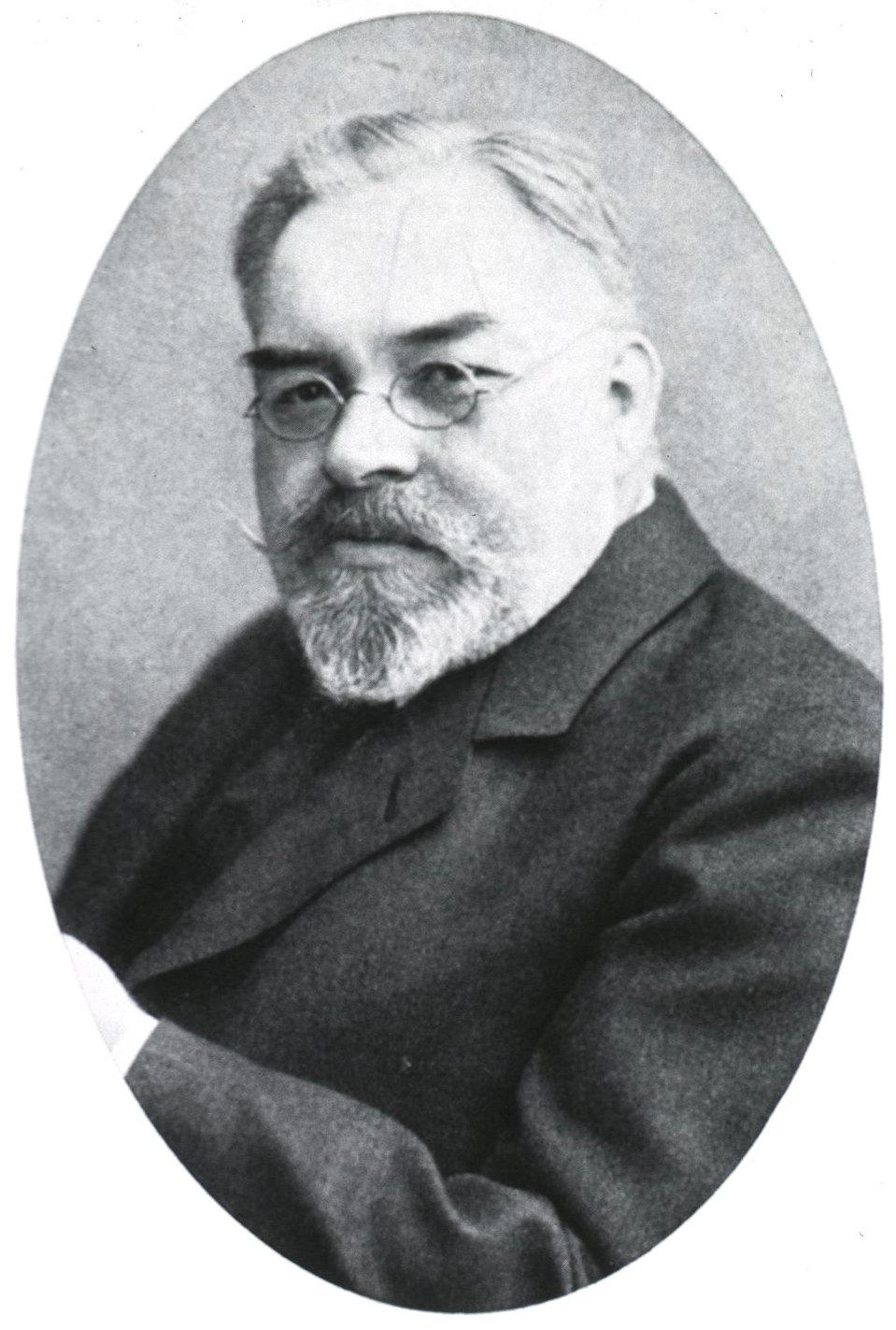
- Born: Franz Alexander Nissl; 9 September 1860; Frankenthal, Kingdom of Bavaria
- Died: 11 August 1919 (aged 58); Munich, German Reich

Academic work
- Doctoral students: Karl Jaspers

Franz Alexander Nissl (German: [ˈnɪsl̩]; 9 September 1860 – 11 August 1919) was a German psychiatrist and medical researcher. He was a noted neuropathologist.

== Early life ==
Nissl was born in Frankenthal to Theodor Nissl and Maria Haas. Theodor taught Latin in a Catholic school and wanted Franz to become a priest. However, Franz entered the Ludwig-Maximilians-Universität München to study medicine. Later, he specialized in Psychiatry.

One of Nissl's university professors was Bernhard von Gudden. His assistant, Sigbert Josef Maria Ganser suggested that Nissl write an essay on the pathology of the cells of the cortex of the brain. When the medical faculty offered a competition for a prize in neurology in 1884, Nissl undertook the brain-cortex study. He used alcohol as a fixative and developed a staining technique that allowed the demonstration of several new nerve-cell constituents. Nissl won the prize, and wrote his doctoral dissertation on the same topic in 1885.

== Career in medical research and education ==
Professor von Gudden was the judge in Nissl's college-essay competition, and he was so impressed with the study that he offered Nissl an assistantship at the Furstenried castle southwest of Munich, where one of his responsibilities was to care for the mad Prince Otto. Nissl accepted, and remained in that post from 1885 until 1888. There was a small laboratory at the castle, which enabled Nissl to continue with his neuropathological research. In 1888, Nissl moved to the Institution Blankenheim. In 1889, he went to Frankfurt as second in position under Emil Sioli (1852–1922) at the Städtische Irrenanstalt. There he met neurologist Ludwig Edinger and neuropathologist Karl Weigert, who was developing a neuroglial stain. This work motivated Nissl to study mental and nervous diseases by relating them to observable changes in glial cells, blood elements, blood vessels and brain tissue in general.

In Frankfurt, Nissl became acquainted with Alois Alzheimer, and they collaborated over seven years. They became close friends, jointly editing the Histologische und histopathologische Arbeiten über die Grosshirnrinde (1904–1921).

In 1895, Emil Kraepelin invited Nissl to become assistant physician at the University of Heidelberg. By 1904 he was a full professor at that institution, and became director of the Department of Psychiatry when Kraepelin moved to Munich.

== Later life and death ==
The burden of teaching and administration, combined with poor research facilities, forced Nissl to leave many scientific projects unfinished. He also suffered from a kidney disease. During World War I he was charged with administering a large military hospital.

In 1918, Kraepelin again invited Nissl to accept a research position at the Deutsche Forschungsanstalt für Psychiatrie in Munich. After one year at that position, where he performed research alongside Korbinian Brodmann and Walther Spielmeyer, he died in 1919 of kidney disease.

== Personal ==
Nissl was of small stature, with poor posture. He had a birthmark on his left face. He never married, and his life revolved entirely around his work.

One day, for a practical joke, Nissl (who was an active campaigner against human consumption of alcohol) placed a row of empty beer bottles outside his laboratory and made sure that Kraepelin heard that he could be found lying under his desk, dead drunk.

Nissl was a competent pianist. Nazi physician Hugo Spatz (1888–1969) told of his first meeting, when Spatz applied for a position in Nissl's laboratory. Nissl was busy that morning and asked the student to come to his home at twelve. When Spatz came to the house at noon, Nissl was not there, and the housekeeper finally opined that the Professor must have meant twelve midnight, so Spatz returned that night. Nissl was at home then, but Spatz had to wait in the anteroom for half an hour until Nissl had finished the piano sonata that he was playing. The conversation lasted until daybreak.

== Legacy ==
Nissl was possibly the greatest neuropathologist of his day and also a fine clinician who popularised the use of spinal puncture, which had been introduced by Heinrich Quincke.

Nissl also examined the neural connections between the human cortex and thalamic nuclei; he was in the midst of this study at the time of his death.

An example of his research philosophy is taken from his 1896 writings:

As soon as we agree to see in all mental derangements the clinical expression of definite disease processes in the cortex, we remove the obstacles that make impossible agreement among alienists.

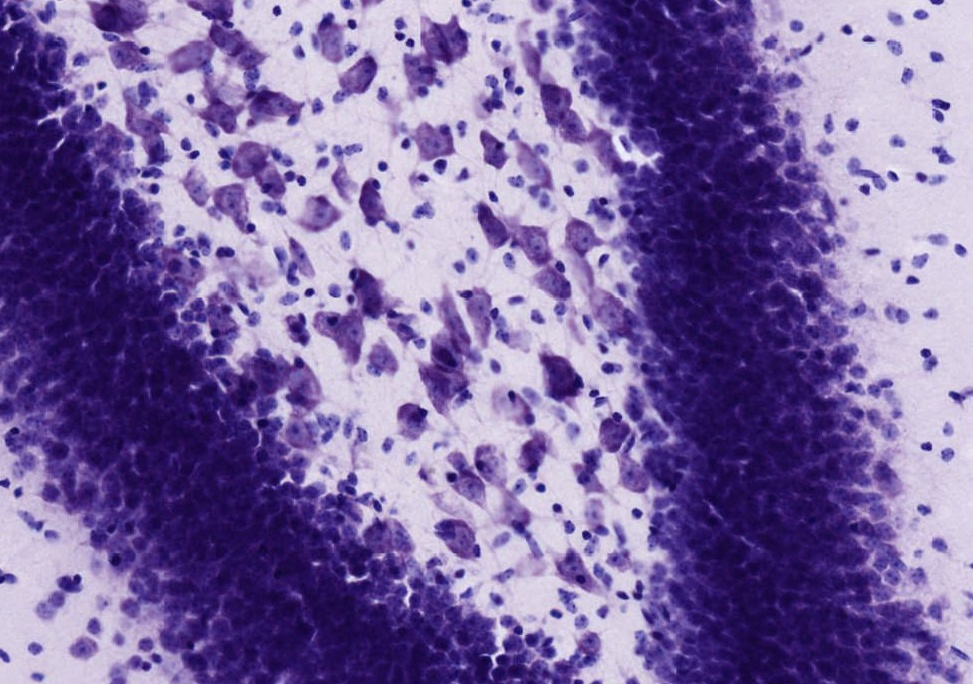
Image of a Nissl-stained histological section through the rodent hippocampus showing various classes of neurons.

== Named histology concepts ==
The Nissl method is the staining of the cell body, and in particular endoplasmic reticulum. This is done by using various basic dyes (e.g., aniline, thionine, or cresyl violet) to stain the negatively charged RNA blue, and is used to highlight important structural features of neurons. The Nissl substance (rough endoplasmic reticulum) appears dark blue due to the staining of ribosomal RNA, giving the cytoplasm a mottled appearance. Individual granules of extranuclear RNA are named Nissl granules (ribosomes). DNA present in the nucleus stains a similar color.

== See also ==
Nissl bodies
