= Nissl body =

Rough endoplasmic reticulum structure found in neurons

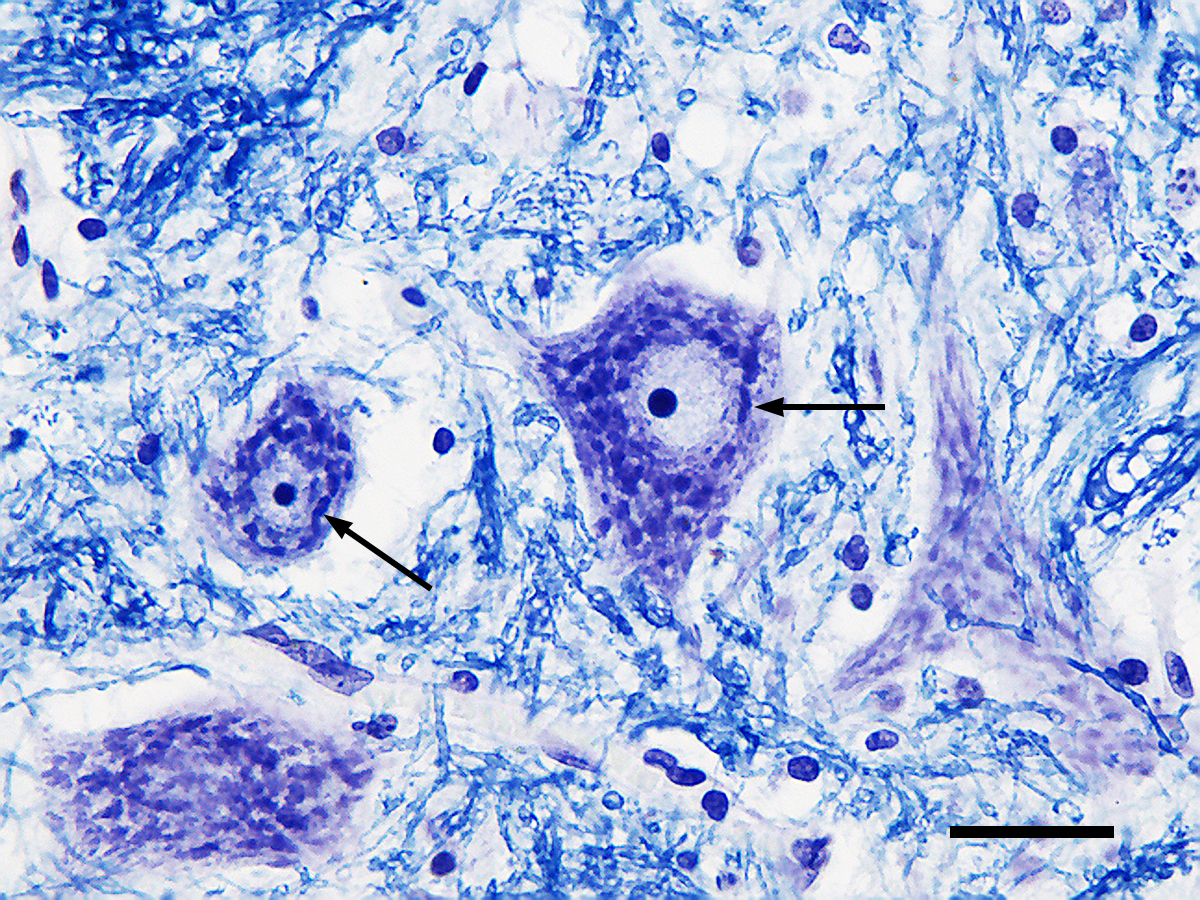
Photomicrograph of Nissl bodies (two are indicated by arrows) in the cytoplasm of motor neurons in the anterior horn of the spinal cord; cresyl violet stain (purple) along with a luxol fast blue stain for myelin. Scale bar = 30 microns (0.03mm).

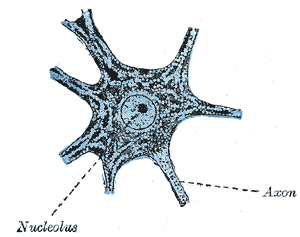
Drawing of a motor neuron from the ventral horn of the medulla spinals of a rabbit. The angular and spindle-shaped Nissl bodies in the cytoplasm are well shown.

In cellular neuroscience, Nissl bodies (also called Nissl granules, Nissl substance or tigroid substance) are discrete granular structures in neurons that consist of rough endoplasmic reticulum, a collection of parallel, membrane-bound cisternae studded with ribosomes on the cytosolic surface of the membranes. Nissl bodies were named after Franz Nissl, a German neuropathologist who invented the staining method bearing his name (Nissl staining). The term "Nissl bodies" generally refers to discrete clumps of rough endoplasmic reticulum and free ribosomes in nerve cells. Masses of rough endoplasmic reticulum also occur in some non-neuronal cells, where they are referred to as ergastoplasm, basophilic bodies, or chromophilic substance. While these organelles differ in some ways from Nissl bodies in neurons, large amounts of rough endoplasmic reticulum are generally linked to the copious production of proteins.

== Staining ==
"Nissl stains" refers to various basic dyes that selectively label negatively charged molecules such as DNA and RNA. Because ribosomes are rich in ribosomal RNA, they are strongly basophilic ("base-loving"). The dense accumulation of membrane-bound and free ribosomes in Nissl bodies results in their intense coloration by Nissl stains, allowing them to be seen with a light microscope.

== Size and distribution ==
Nissl bodies occur in the somata and dendrites of neurons, though not in the axon or axon hillock. They vary in size, shape, and intracellular location; they are most conspicuous in the motor neurons of the spinal cord and brainstem, where they appear as large, blocky assemblies. In other neurons, they may be smaller, and in some (such as the granule neurons of the cerebellar cortex) very little rough endoplasmic reticulum is present. The pattern of coloration with Nissl stains once was used to classify neurons. For various reasons, this practice has largely ceased, but specific neuronal types do manifest characteristic types of Nissl bodies.

== Functional role ==
The functions of Nissl bodies are thought to be the same as those of the rough endoplasmic reticulum in general, primarily the synthesis and segregation of proteins. Similar to the ergastoplasm of glandular cells, Nissl bodies are the main site of protein synthesis in the neuronal cytoplasm. The ultrastructure of Nissl bodies suggests they are primarily concerned with the synthesis of proteins for intracellular use.

== Pathology ==
Nissl bodies show changes under various physiological conditions and in pathological conditions such as axonotmesis, during which they may dissolve and largely disappear (chromatolysis). If the neuron is successful in repairing the damage, the Nissl bodies gradually reappear and return to their characteristic distribution within the cell.
