= Cresyl violet =

Basic dye and is used as a common stain in histology

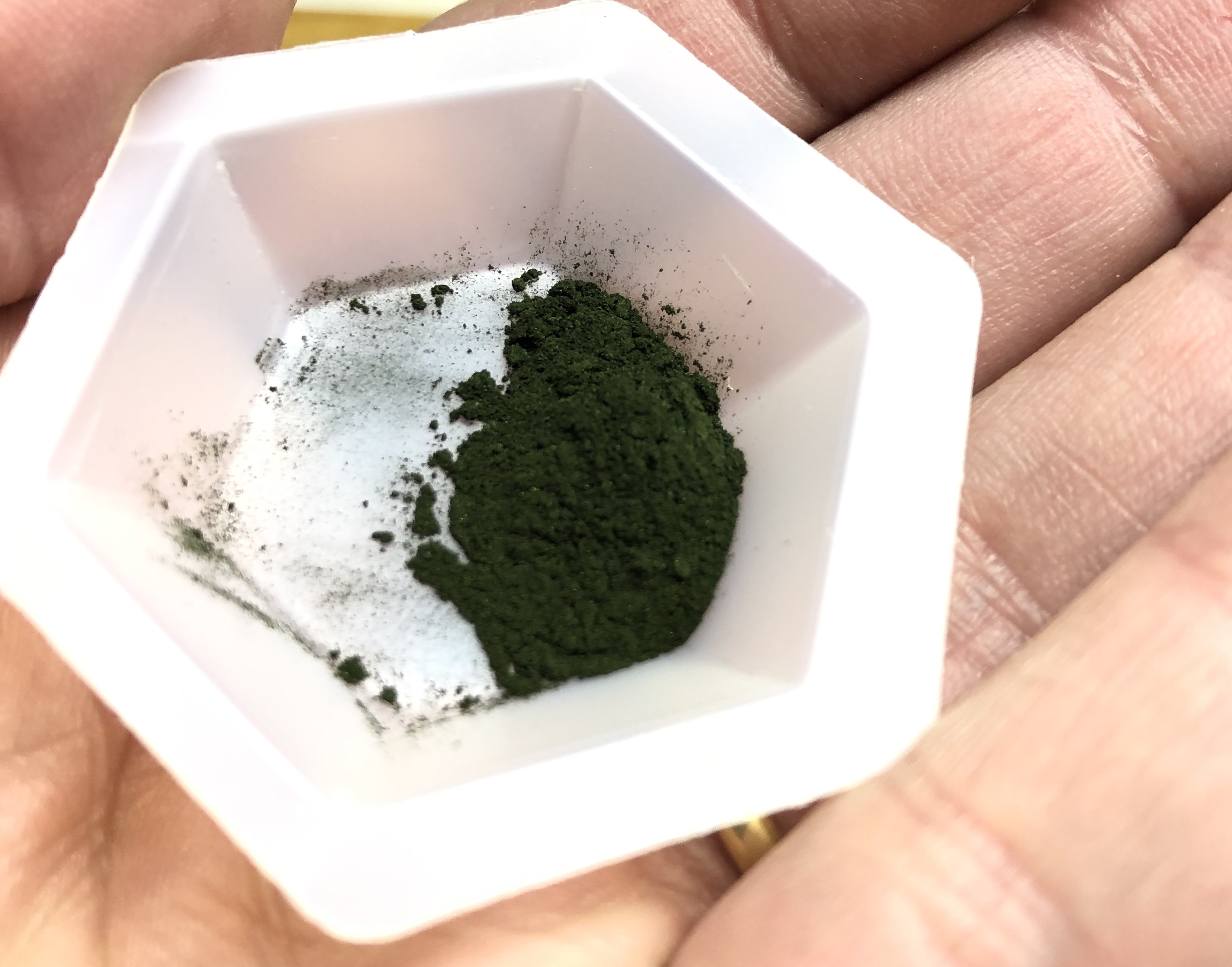

Names
- IUPAC name (9-dimethylamino-10-methyl-benzo[a]phenoxazin-5-ylidene)ammonium chloride
- Other names 9-(Dimethylamino)-5-imino-10-methyl-5H-benzo[a]phenoxazine hydrochloride Cresole violet

Identifiers
CAS Number	18472-89-4
3D model (JSmol)	Interactive image
Beilstein Reference	3910949
ChEBI	CHEBI:52815
ChemSpider	27064
EC Number	242-356-1
PubChem CID	29092
UNII	2AB49C465R
CompTox Dashboard (EPA)	DTXSID10939892
- InChI: InChI=1S/C19H17N3O.ClH/c1-11-8-15-17(10-16(11)22(2)3)23-18-9-14(20)12-6-4-5-7-13(12)19(18)21-15;/h4-10,20H,1-3H3;1H Key: ZHAFUINZIZIXFC-UHFFFAOYSA-N; InChI=1/C19H17N3O.ClH/c1-11-8-15-17(10-16(11)22(2)3)23-18-9-14(20)12-6-4-5-7-13(12)19(18)21-15;/h4-10,20H,1-3H3;1H Key: ZHAFUINZIZIXFC-UHFFFAOYAN
- SMILES: [Cl-].N=1c4c(OC=3C=1c2ccccc2\C(=[NH2+])\C=3)cc(c(c4)C)N(C)C

Properties
Chemical formula	C_{19}H_{18}ClN_{3}O
Molar mass	339.8187

Hazards
Flash point	245.5 °C (473.9 °F; 518.6 K)
- Except where otherwise noted, data are given for materials in their standard state (at 25 °C [77 °F], 100 kPa). verify (what is ?) Infobox references

Cresyl violet is an organic compound with the chemical formula C_{19}H_{18}ClN_{3}O. It is a basic dye and is used as a common stain in histology.

== Cresyl violet stain ==
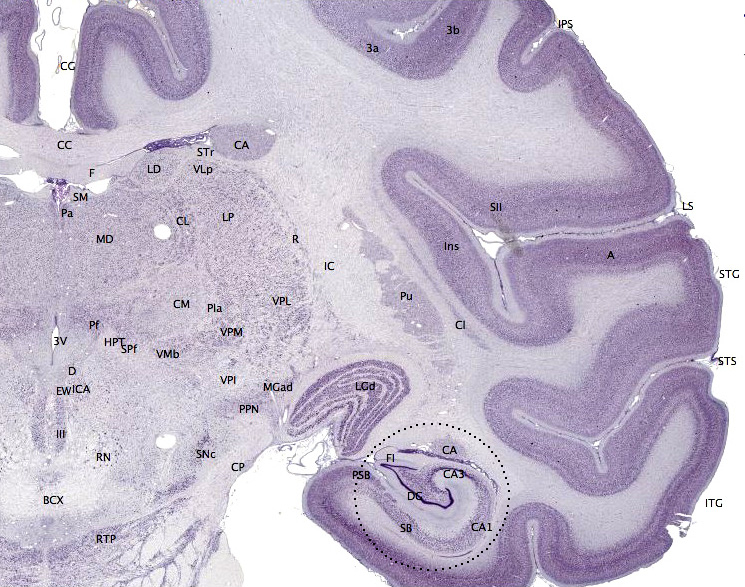
Cresyl violet stained partial brain section of a Macaque.

It is used in biology and medicine as a histological stain. Cresyl violet is an effective and reliable stain used for light microscopy sections. Initially, tissue sections are "defatted" by passing through graded dilutions of ethanol. Then, rehydrated by passing back through decreasing concentrations of ethanol. Lastly, back into water. The ethanol solutions act to differentiate the stain, causing myelin and other components to lose color whereas perikarya retain the color. It is also used to find Helicobacter pylori.

Intestinal mucins also take up the stain although not as strongly as Campylobacter-like organisms.

Cresyl violet is used to stain Heinz bodies in red blood corpuscles or for staining of the neurons in the brain and spinal cord. It is used to demonstrate the Nissl substance in the neurons and cell nuclei. In this role it is also often used as a counterstain to Luxol fast blue, which stains the myelin.
