= Joint manipulation =

Passive movement of a skeletal joint

Joint manipulation is a type of passive movement of a skeletal joint. It is usually aimed at one or more 'target' synovial joints with the aim of achieving a therapeutic effect.

== Definition of manipulation ==
Many definitions of joint manipulation have been proposed. The most rigorous definition, based on available empirical research is that of Evans and Lucas: "Separation (gapping) of opposing articular surfaces of a synovial joint, caused by a force applied perpendicularly to those articular surfaces, that results in cavitation within the synovial fluid of that joint." The corresponding definition for the mechanical response of a manipulation is: "Separation (gapping) of opposing articular surfaces of a synovial joint that results in cavitation within the synovial fluid of that joint." In turn, the action of a manipulation can be defined as: "A force applied perpendicularly to the articular surfaces."

== Practice of manipulation ==
A modern re-emphasis on manipulative therapy occurred in the late 19th century in North America with the emergence of osteopathic medicine and chiropractic medicine. In the context of healthcare, joint manipulation is performed by several professional groups. In North America and Europe, joint manipulation is most commonly performed by chiropractors (estimated to perform over 90% of all manipulative treatments), American-trained osteopathic physicians, occupational therapists, physiotherapists, and European osteopaths. When applied to joints in the spine, it is referred to as spinal manipulation.

== Terminology ==
Manipulation is known by several other names. Historically, general practitioners and orthopaedic surgeons have used the term "manipulation". Chiropractors refer to manipulation of a spinal joint as an 'adjustment'. Following the labelling system developed by Geoffery Maitland, manipulation is synonymous with Grade V mobilization, a term commonly used by physical therapists. Because of its distinct biomechanics (see section below), the term high velocity low amplitude (HVLA) thrust is often used interchangeably with manipulation.

== Biomechanics ==
Manipulation can be distinguished from other manual therapy interventions such as joint mobilization by its biomechanics, both kinetics and kinematics.

=== Kinetics ===
Until recently, force-time histories measured during spinal manipulation were described as consisting of three distinct phases: the preload (or prethrust) phase, the thrust phase, and the resolution phase. Evans and Breen added a fourth 'orientation' phase to describe the period during which the patient is oriented into the appropriate position in preparation for the prethrust phase.

When individual peripheral synovial joints are manipulated, the distinct force-time phases that occur during spinal manipulation are not as evident. In particular, the rapid rate of change of force that occurs during the thrust phase when spinal joints are manipulated is not always necessary. Most studies to have measured forces used to manipulate peripheral joints, such as the metacarpophalangeal (MCP) joints, show no more than gradually increasing load. This is probably because there are many more tissues restraining a spinal motion segment than an independent MCP joint.

=== Kinematics ===
The kinematics of a complete spinal motion segment when one of its constituent spinal joints are manipulated are much more complex than the kinematics that occur during manipulation of an independent peripheral synovial joint. Even so, the motion that occurs between the articular surfaces of any individual synovial joint during manipulation should be very similar and is described below.

Early models describing the kinematics of an individual target joint during the various phases of manipulation (notably Sandoz 1976) were based on studies that investigated joint cracking in MCP joints. The cracking was elicited by pulling the proximal phalanx away from the metacarpal bone (to separate, or 'gap' the articular surfaces of the MCP joint) with gradually increasing force until a sharp resistance, caused by the cohesive properties of synovial fluid, was met and then broken. These studies were therefore never designed to form models of therapeutic manipulation, and the models formed were erroneous in that they described the target joint as being configured at the end range of a rotation movement, during the orientation phase. The model then predicted that this end range position was maintained during the prethrust phase until the thrust phase where it was moved beyond the 'physiologic barrier' created by synovial fluid resistance; conveniently within the limits of anatomical integrity provided by restraining tissues such as the joint capsule and ligaments. This model still dominates the literature. However, after re-examining the original studies on which the kinematic models of joint manipulation were based, Evans and Breen argued that the optimal prethrust position is actually the equivalent of the neutral zone of the individual joint, which is the motion region of the joint where the passive osteoligamentous stability mechanisms exert little or no influence. This new model predicted that the physiologic barrier is only confronted when the articular surfaces of the joint are separated (gapped, rather than the rolling or sliding that usually occurs during physiological motion), and that it is more mechanically efficient to do this when the joint is near to its neutral configuration.

== Cracking joints ==
Joint manipulation is characteristically associated with the production of an audible 'clicking' or 'popping' sound. This sound is believed to be the result of a phenomenon known as cavitation occurring within the synovial fluid of the joint. When a manipulation is performed, the applied force separates the articular surfaces of a fully encapsulated synovial joint. This deforms the joint capsule and intra-articular tissues, which in turn creates a reduction in pressure within the joint cavity. In this low pressure environment, some of the gases that are dissolved in the synovial fluid (which are naturally found in all bodily fluids) leave solution creating a bubble or cavity, which rapidly collapses upon itself, resulting in a 'clicking' sound. The contents of this gas bubble are thought to be mainly carbon dioxide. The effects of this process will remain for a period of time termed the 'refractory period', which can range from a few minutes to more than an hour, while it is slowly reabsorbed back into the synovial fluid. There is some evidence that ligament laxity around the target joint is associated with an increased probability of cavitation.

== Clinical effects and mechanisms of action ==
The clinical effects of joint manipulation have been shown to include:

- Temporary relief of musculoskeletal pain.
- Shortened time to recover from acute back sprains (Rand).
- Temporary increase in passive range of motion (ROM).
- Physiological effects upon the central nervous system.
- No alteration of the position of the sacroiliac joint.

Common side effects of spinal manipulative therapy (SMT) are characterized as mild to moderate and may include: local discomfort, headache, tiredness, or radiating discomfort.

Shekelle (1994) summarised the published theories for mechanism(s) of action for how joint manipulation may exert its clinical effects as the following:

- Release of entrapped synovial folds or plica
- Relaxation of hypertonic muscle
- Disruption of articular or periarticular adhesions
- Unbuckling of motion segments that have undergone disproportionate displacement

== Safety issues ==
As with all interventions, there are risks associated with joint manipulation, especially manipulation of spinal joints. Infrequent, but potentially serious side effects, include: vertebrobasilar accidents (VBA), strokes, spinal disc herniation, vertebral and rib fractures, and cauda equina syndrome.

In a 1993 study, J.D. Cassidy, DC, and co-workers concluded that the treatment of lumbar intervertebral disk herniation by side posture manipulation is "both safe and effective." In a 2019 study, L.M. Mabry, PT, and colleagues reported joint manipulation adverse events to be rare.

=== Risks of upper cervical manipulation ===
The degree of serious risks associated with manipulation of the cervical spine is uncertain, with widely differing results being published.

A 2008 study in the journal "Spine", JD Cassidy, E Boyle, P Cote', Y He, et al. investigated 818 VBA strokes that were hospitalized in a population of more than 100 million person-years. In those aged <45 years, cases were about three times more likely to see a chiropractor or a PCP before their stroke than controls. Results were similar in the case control and case cross over analyses. There was no increased association between chiropractic visits and VBA stroke in those older than 45 years. Positive associations were found between PCP visits and VBA stroke in all age groups. The study concluded that VBA stroke is a very rare event in the population. The increased risks of VBA stroke associated with chiropractic and PCP visits is likely due to patients with headache and neck pain from VBA dissection seeking care before their stroke. The study found no evidence of excess risk of VBA stroke associated chiropractic care compared to primary care.

A 1996 Danish chiropractic study confirmed the risk of stroke to be low, and determined that the greatest risk is with manipulation of the first two vertebra of the cervical spine, particularly passive rotation of the neck, known as the "master cervical" or "rotary break."

Serious complications after manipulation of the cervical spine are estimated to be 1 in 4 million manipulations or fewer. A RAND Corporation extensive review estimated "one in a million." Dvorak, in a survey of 203 practitioners of manual medicine in Switzerland, found a rate of one serious complication per 400,000 cervical manipulations, without any reported deaths, among an estimated 1.5 million cervical manipulations. Jaskoviak reported approximately 5 million cervical manipulations from 1965 to 1980 at The National College of Chiropractic Clinic in Chicago, without a single case of vertebral artery stroke or serious injury. Henderson and Cassidy performed a survey at the Canadian Memorial Chiropractic College outpatient clinic where more than a half-million treatments were given over a nine-year period, again without serious incident. Eder offered a report of 168,000 cervical manipulations over a 28-year period, again without a single significant complication. After an extensive literature review performed to formulate practice guidelines, the authors concurred that "the risk of serious neurological complications (from cervical manipulation) is extremely low, and is approximately one or two per million cervical manipulations."

In comparison, there is a 3-4% rate of complications for cervical spinal surgery, and 4,000-10,000 deaths per million neck surgeries.

Understandably, vascular accidents are responsible for the major criticism of spinal manipulative therapy. However, it has been pointed out that "critics of manipulative therapy emphasize the possibility of serious injury, especially at the brain stem, due to arterial trauma after cervical manipulation. It has required only the very rare reporting of these accidents to malign a therapeutic procedure that, in experienced hands, gives beneficial results with few adverse side effects". In very rare instances, the manipulative adjustment to the cervical spine of a vulnerable patient becomes the final intrusive act which results in a very serious consequence.

=== Potential for incident underreporting ===
Statistics on the reliability of incident reporting for injuries related to manipulation of the cervical spine vary. The RAND study assumed that only 1 in 10 cases would have been reported. However, Prof Ernst surveyed neurologists in Britain for cases of serious neurological complications occurring within 24 hours of cervical spinal manipulation by various types of practitioners; 35 cases had been seen by the 24 neurologists who responded, but none of the cases had been reported. He concluded that underreporting was close to 100%, rendering estimates "nonsensical." He therefore suggested that "clinicians might tell their patients to adopt a cautious approach and avoid the type of spinal manipulation for which the risk seems greatest: forceful manipulation of the upper spine with a rotational element." The NHS Centre for Reviews and Dissemination stated that the survey had methodological problems with data collection. Both NHS and Ernst noted that bias is a problem with the survey method of data collection.

A 2001 study in the journal Stroke found that vertebrobasilar accidents (VBAs) were five times more likely in those aged less than 45 years who had visited a chiropractor in the preceding week, compared to controls who had not visited a chiropractor. No significant associations were found for those over 45 years. The authors concluded: "While our analysis is consistent with a positive association in young adults... The rarity of VBAs makes this association difficult to study despite high volumes of chiropractic treatment." The NHS notes that this study collected data objectively by using administrative data, involving less recall bias than survey studies, but the data were collected retrospectively and probably contained inaccuracies.

In 1996, Coulter et al. had a multidisciplinary group of 4 MDs, 4 DCs and 1 MD/DC look at 736 conditions where it was used. Their job was to evaluate the appropriateness of manipulation or mobilization of the cervical spine in those cases (including a few cases not performed by chiropractors).

"According to the report ... 57.6% of reported indications for cervical manipulation was considered inappropriate, with 31.3% uncertain. Only 11.1% could be labeled appropriate. A panel of chiropractors and medical practitioners concluded that '. . . much additional scientific data about the efficacy of cervical spine manipulation are needed.'"

=== Misattribution problems ===
Studies of stroke and manipulation do not always clearly identify what professional has performed the manipulation. In some cases this has led to confusion and improper placement of blame. In a 1995 study, chiropractic researcher Allan Terrett, DC, pointed to this problem:

"The words chiropractic and chiropractor have been incorrectly used in numerous publications dealing with SMT injury by medical authors, respected medical journals and medical organizations. In many cases, this is not accidental; the authors had access to original reports that identified the practitioner involved as a nonchiropractor. The true incidence of such reporting cannot be determined. Such reporting adversely affects the reader's opinion of chiropractic and chiropractors."

This error was taken into account in a 1999 review of the scientific literature on the risks and benefits of manipulation of the cervical spine (MCS). Special care was taken, whenever possible, to correctly identify all the professions involved, as well as the type of manipulation responsible for any injuries and/or deaths. It analyzed 177 cases that were reported in 116 articles published between 1925 and 1997, and summarized:

"The most frequently reported injuries involved arterial dissection or spasm, and lesions of the brain stem. Death occurred in 32 (18%) of the cases. Physical therapists were involved in less than 2% of the cases, and no deaths have been attributed to MCS provided by physical therapists. Although the risk of injury associated with MCS appears to be small, this type of therapy has the potential to expose patients to vertebral artery damage that can be avoided with the use of mobilization (nonthrust passive movements)."

In Figure 1 in the review, the types of injuries attributed to manipulation of the cervical spine are shown, and Figure 2 shows the type of practitioner involved in the resulting injury. For the purpose of comparison, the type of practitioner was adjusted according to the findings by Terrett.

The review concluded:

"The literature does not demonstrate that the benefits of MCS outweigh the risks. Several recommendations for future studies and for the practice of MCS are discussed."

Edzard Ernst has written:

"...there is little evidence to demonstrate that spinal manipulation has any specific therapeutic effects. On the other hand, there is convincing evidence to show that it is associated with frequent, mild adverse effects as well as with serious complications of unknown incidence. Therefore, it seems debatable whether the benefits of spinal manipulation outweigh its risks. Specific risk factors for vascular accidents related to spinal manipulation have not been identified, which means that any patient may be at risk, particularly those below 45 years of age. Definitive, prospective studies that can overcome the limitations of previous investigations are now a matter of urgency. Until they are available, clinicians might tell their patients to adopt a cautious approach and avoid the type of spinal manipulation for which the risk seems greatest: forceful manipulation of the upper spine with a rotational element."

== Emergency medicine ==
In emergency medicine joint manipulation can also refer to the process of bringing fragments of fractured bone or dislocated joints into normal anatomical alignment (otherwise known as 'reducing' the fracture or dislocation). These procedures have no relation to the HVLA thrust procedure.

== See also ==
- Orthopedic medicine
- Osteopathic manipulative medicine
- Physical therapy
- Small joint manipulation
