= Manual therapy =

Physical treatment used to treat musculoskeletal pain and disability

Manual therapy, or manipulative therapy, is a treatment primarily used by physical therapists, occupational therapists, and massage therapists to treat musculoskeletal pain and disability. It mostly includes kneading and manipulation of muscles, joint mobilization and joint manipulation. It is also used by Rolfers, athletic trainers, osteopaths, and physicians.

== Definitions ==
Irvin Korr, J. S. Denslow and colleagues did the original body of research on manual therapy. Korr described it as the "Application of an accurately determined and specifically directed manual force to the body, in order to improve mobility in areas that are restricted; in joints, in connective tissues or in skeletal muscles."

According to the Orthopaedic Manual Physical Therapy Description of Advanced Specialty Practice manual therapy is defined as a clinical approach utilizing specific hands-on techniques, including but not limited to manipulation/mobilization, used by the physical therapist to diagnose and treat soft tissues and joint structures for the purpose of modulating pain; increasing range of motion (ROM); reducing or eliminating soft tissue inflammation; inducing relaxation; improving contractile and non-contractile tissue repair, extensibility, and/or stability; facilitating movement; and improving function.

A consensus study of US chiropractors defined manual therapy (generally known as the "chiropractic adjustment" in the profession) as "Procedures by which the hands directly contact the body to treat the articulations and/or soft tissues."

== Origin and History ==
Massage and spinal manipulation are said to be the most widely used and earliest manual interventions. The earliest historical reference to manipulative therapy as a practice was in Europe dating back to 400 BCE. Historically, the origin of manipulation can be traced to many parts of the world where it was used for a variety of musculoskeletal conditions. It was proposed that Spinal Manipulation was widely used across the world and was very prominent in the early interventions of manual therapy. Spinal Manipulation was said to be used in places like Indonesia by the Balinese, Hawaii by the Lomi-Lomi, in different areas of Japan, China, and India, in Central Asia by the shamans, in Mexico by sabadors, and used by bonesetters in Russia, Norway, and Nepal.

In the latter half of the 19th century, massage was seen growing in popularity with English nurses, originally involving musculoskeletal rehabilitation for injured British soldiers. As the demand in massage therapy grew throughout medicine, nurses started doing specialized training to become a masseuse. Furthermore, in 1920, John Martin Littlejohn delivered lectures in London to "The Chartered Society of Massage and Medical Gymnastics." By 1926, many society members completed his intensive two-year course to become Manipulative Specialists. This was one of the first true professional titles in relating to manual therapy, and an early stage of it becoming a prominent medical modality.

=== Notable Names/Pioneers ===
- Andrew Taylor Still
- Daniel David Palmer
- James Henry Cyriax
- Freddy Kaltenborn
- Geoff Maitland
- Robin McKenzie
- Hippocrates
- Bonesetters
- Mary Mcmillan
- Per Henrick Ling

== Use and method ==
In Pakistan, Western Europe, North America and Australasia, manual therapy is usually practiced by members of specific health care professions (e.g. Chiropractors, Occupational Therapists, Osteopaths, Osteopathic physicians, Physiotherapists/Physical Therapists, Massage Therapists and Physiatrists). However, some lay practitioners (not members of a structured profession), such as bonesetters also provide some forms of manual therapy.

How to apply a specific modality of manual therapy is mainly dependent on the client's acute or chronic condition, age, and level of pain. The goal of massage and manual therapy is to render the appropriate treatment to optimize the body's own healing potential, whilst being specific to the client's condition. The underlying goal is to produce profound relaxation during the techniques for increased results.

A survey released in May 2004 by the National Center for Complementary and Integrative Health focused on who used complementary and alternative medicine (CAM), what was used, and why it was used in the United States by adults during 2002. Massage was the fifth most commonly use CAM in the United States in 2007.

=== Techniques ===
- Myofascial therapy targets the muscle and fascial systems, promotes flexibility and mobility of the body's connective tissues. It is said to mobilize adhesions and reduce severity/sensitivity of scarring. A critical analysis finds that the relevance of fascia to therapy doubtful.
- Massage may be used as part of a treatment. Proponents claim this may reduce inflammation. Science writer Paul Ingraham notes that there is no evidence to support the claim.
- Friction massage is said to increase mobilization of adhesions between fascial layers, muscles, compartments and other soft tissues. They are thought to create an inflammatory response and instigate focus to injured areas. A 2002 systematic review found that no additional benefit was incurred from the inclusion of deep tissue friction massage in a therapeutic regimen, although the conclusions were limited by the small sample sizes in available randomized clinical trials.
- Soft Tissue Technique is firm, direct pressure to relax hypertonic muscles and stretch tight fascial structures. A 2015 review concluded that the technique is ineffective for lower back pain, and the quality of research testing its effectiveness is poor.
- Trigger point techniques claim to address myofascial trigger points, though the explanation of how this works is controversial. Myofascial trigger points (MTrPs) are hypersensitive nodules with taut bands of skeletal muscle or fascia. They can produce localized or referred pain.

=== Joint Mobilization Grading Systems ===
Different grading systems exist for joint mobilizations. Two of the most widely used, and evidence-backed grading systems are proposed by Maitland and Kaltenborn.

The Maitland system is based on joint oscillation techniques and has 5 different grades. Maitland's grades are based on pain reduction, mobility increase, and a thrust technique when resistance limits movement without pain. The Kaltenborn system is based on sustained hold gliding techniques and traction. There are grades 1 through 3 for traction, and grades 2 and 3 for gliding. There is no grade 1 for gliding according to Kaltenborn. The systems differ with Maitland being oscillatory (movement), and Kaltenborn being sustained (hold).

Evidence has shown that these graded techniques have been highly beneficial in treating frozen shoulder and spinal dysfunction. They are practiced in clinics all around the world, and lay foundations for pain relief and range of motion benefits.

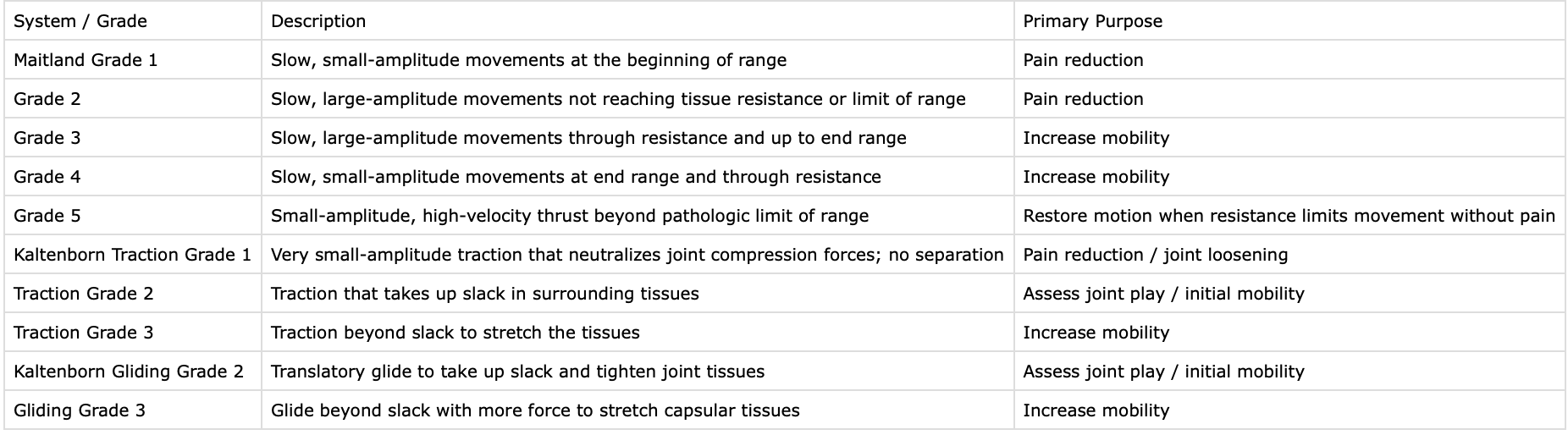
Grading Systems: Maitland and Kaltenborn: Description and Purpose

=== Instrument Assisted Soft Tissue Mobilization (IASTM) ===
Instrument assisted soft tissue mobilization (IASTM), is a skilled myofascial intervention used for soft-tissue treatment. It is applied using instruments that are typically made of stainless steel, and shaped to conform to different anatomical positions of the body allowing for deeper penetration. It is used to manipulate skin, myofascia, muscles, and tendon by various compressive stroke techniques. IASTM techniques can both detect and treat soft tissue disorders. Studies have shown clinical benefits of IASTM in improving range of motion, strength, and pain perception following treatment.

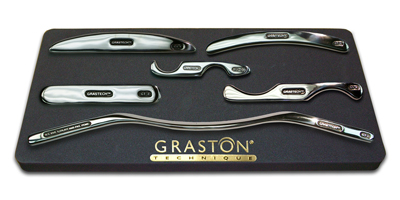
Graston Equipment - (IASTM)

There are many companies with tools for IASTM such as, RockTape, Graston(shown in image), HawkGrips, Adhesion Breakers, Functional and Kinetic Treatment with Rehab (FAKTR), and Tecnica Gavilan. Each company has its own design and treatment approach.

=== Stretching ===
From the main article's effectiveness section:

- Apart from before running, stretching does not appear to reduce risk of injury during exercise.
- Some evidence shows that pre-exercise stretching may increase range of movement.
- The Mayo Clinic advises against bouncing, and to hold for thirty seconds. They suggest warming up before stretching or stretching post-exercise.

=== Taping ===
Manual therapy practitioners often use therapeutic taping to relieve pressure on injured soft tissue, alter muscle firing patterns or prevent re-injury. Some techniques are designed to enhance lymphatic fluid exchange. After a soft tissue injury to muscles or tendons from sports activities, over exertion or repetitive strain injury swelling may impede blood flow to the area and slow healing. Elastic taping methods may relieve pressure from swollen tissue and enhance circulation to the injured area.

According to the medical and skeptical community there is no known benefit from this technique and it is a pseudoscience.

== Styles of manual therapy ==
There are many different styles of manual therapy. It is a fundamental feature of ayurvedic medicine, traditional Chinese medicine and some forms of alternative medicine as well as being used by mainstream medical practitioners. Hands-on bodywork is a feature of therapeutic interactions in traditional cultures around the world.

- Acupressure
- Anma
- Bobath concept
- Bodywork (alternative medicine)
- Bone setting
- Bowen Technique
- Chiropractic
- Cranio-sacral therapy
- Dorn method
- Joint manipulation
- Joint mobilization
- Sekkotsu
- Spinal manipulation
- Spinal mobilization
- Massage therapy
- Manual lymphatic drainage
- Medical acupuncture
- Muscle energy techniques
- Myofascial release (MFR)
- Myotherapy
- Naprapathy
- Osteopathic manipulative medicine
- Osteopathy
- Physiotherapy
- Postural Integration
- Rolfing
- Shiatsu
- Siddha Medicine
- Structural Integration
- Traction
- Tui na
- Zero Balancing

== Efficacy ==
In 2018, the Journal of Orthopaedic & Sports Physical Therapy stated that due to the wide range of issues with various parts of the body and different techniques used, as well as a lack of modeling behavior, it can be difficult to tell just how effective manual therapy can be for a patient.

More recent research published in 2024 explained that historically, traditional manual therapy had no basis deeming it an effective modality for treatment of musculoskeletal diseases and pain. This faulty modality was centered around the clinician's palpation, patho-anatomical reasoning, and technique specificity. The previously known manual therapy is shifting into a highly effective modern day physical therapy, which is not dependent on perfect palpation, and rather utilizes a patient-centered care model. Based on clinical trials and current data, modern day manual therapy is deemed effective when used in conjunction with other modalities for patients suffering with musculoskeletal diseases. The modern practice of manual therapy is centered around values such as safety, comfort, efficiency, communication, and patient-centeredness. Through this new approach, clinicians are encouraging their patients to assess their outcomes and progress and reevaluate their pain, thereby aligning the practice of manual therapy with the holistic approach to healthcare.

Results for migraines, headaches, and asthma are mixed due to a lack of clinical trials, though at least one article states that manual therapy is effective for asthma.

Manual therapy was shown to be effective for treating back pain, with trigger point therapy being used for myofascial pain, and manual manipulation for lower back pain.

The therapeutic pressure relieves pain and increases range of motion. While patients may complain of muscle soreness post treatment, this effect is expected and it is not deemed adverse.

== See also ==
- Body psychotherapy
- McKenzie method
- Osteopathy
- Physical therapy
- Qigong
- Siddha medicine
- Fascial Manipulation
