= Spinal mobilization =

Spinal mobilization is a type of passive movement of a spinal segment or region. It is usually performed with the aim of achieving a therapeutic effect.

Spinal mobilization has been described as "a gentle, often oscillatory, passive movement applied to a spinal region or segment so as gently to increase the passive range of motion of that segment or region."

== Types of techniques ==
Spinal mobilization employ a range of techniques or schools of approaches in delivering the passive movement. Some examples include

- Maitland Technique
- Mulligan Technique

== See also ==
- Joint mobilization
- Joint manipulation
- Spinal manipulation
- Orthopedic medicine
- Osteopathic Manipulative Medicine
- Chiropractic
- Physical therapy
- Occupational Therapy
