= Spinal manipulation =

Intervention performed on spinal joints

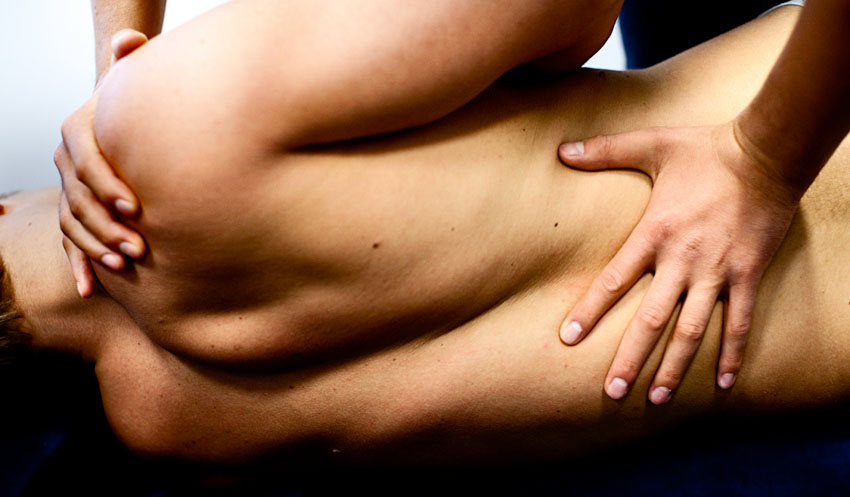
- A chiropractor performing a spinal manipulation of the thoracic spine on a patient.

Alternative therapy
- NCCIH Classification: Manipulative and body-based
- Legality: Legal in adults, treatment of children varies by jurisdiction
- MeSH: D020393

Spinal manipulation is an intervention performed on synovial joints of the spine, including the z-joints, the atlanto-occipital, atlanto-axial, lumbosacral, sacroiliac, costotransverse and costovertebral joints. It is typically applied with therapeutic intent, most commonly for the treatment of low back pain.

== Effectiveness ==
=== Back pain ===
Clinical guidelines from different countries come to different conclusions with respect to spinal manipulation.

A 2012 Cochrane review found that spinal manipulation was no more effective than placebo. A 2010 systematic review found that most studies suggest SM achieves equal or superior improvement in pain and function compared with other commonly used interventions for short-, intermediate-, and long-term follow-up. A 2019 systematic review concluded that SM produced comparable results to recommended treatments for chronic low back pain, while SM appeared to give improved results over non-recommended therapies for short-term functional improvement.

In 2007, the American College of Physicians and the American Pain Society jointly recommended that clinicians consider spinal manipulation for patients who do not improve with self-care options, and the Clinical Guideline Committee for the American College of Physicians updated the guideline in 2017 to include that non-pharmacological approaches to pain management should be considered, however, that there is only low-quality evidence supporting effectiveness of spinal manipulation. Reviews published in 2008 and 2006 suggested that SM for low back pain was equally effective as other commonly used interventions. A 2007 literature synthesis found good evidence supporting SM and mobilization for low back pain. Of four systematic reviews published between 2000 and 2005, one recommended SM and three stated that there was insufficient evidence to make recommendations. A 2017 review concludes "for patients with nonchronic, nonradicular LBP, available evidence does not support the use of spinal manipulation or exercise therapy in addition to standard medical therapy."

=== Neck pain ===
For neck pain, manipulation and mobilization produce similar changes, and manual therapy and exercise are more effective than other strategies. A 2015 Cochrane systematic review found that there is no high-quality evidence assessing the effectiveness of spinal manipulation for treating neck pain. Moderate-to-low-quality evidence suggests that multiple spinal manipulation sessions may provide improved pain relief and an improvement in function when compared to certain medications. Due to the potential risks associated with spinal manipulation, high-quality randomized controlled trials are needed to determine the clinical role of spinal manipulation. A 2007 systematic review reported that there is moderate- to high-quality evidence that subjects with chronic neck pain, not due to whiplash and without arm pain and headaches, show clinically meaningful improvements from a course of spinal manipulation or mobilization. There is not enough evidence to suggest that spinal manipulation is an effective long-term treatment for whiplash, but there are short-term benefits.

=== Non-musculoskeletal disorders ===
Historically, some within the chiropractic profession have claimed that spinal adjustments have physiological effects on visceral functions and thus affect overall health beyond musculoskeletal conditions. This view originated in the 19th century with Daniel David Palmer's original thesis that subluxations caused many diseases. Over time, this hypothesis is inconsistent with our modern understanding of pathology and disease, and only "a small proportion of chiropractors, osteopaths, and other manual medicine providers use[ing] spinal manipulative therapy (SMT) to manage non-musculoskeletal disorders. However, the efficacy and effectiveness of these interventions to prevent or treat non-musculoskeletal disorders remain controversial."

A 2019 global summit of "50 researchers from 8 countries and 28 observers from 18 chiropractic organizations" conducted a systematic review of the literature, and 44 of the 50 "found no evidence of an effect of SMT for the management of non-musculoskeletal disorders including infantile colic, childhood asthma, hypertension, primary dysmenorrhea, and migraine. This finding challenges the validity of the theory that treating spinal dysfunctions with SMT has a physiological effect on organs and their function."

=== Assistance of medication or anesthesia ===
As for manipulation with the assistance of medication or anesthesia, a 2013 review concludes that the best evidence lacks coherence to support its use for chronic spine pain.

== Safety ==
There is not sufficient data to establish the safety of spinal manipulations, and the rate of adverse events is unknown. Spinal manipulation is frequently associated with mild to moderate temporary adverse effects, and also rare serious outcomes which can result in permanent disability or death. The National Health Service in the UK notes that about half of people reported encountering adverse effects following spinal manipulation. Adverse events are increasingly reported in randomized clinical trials of spinal manipulation but remain under-reported despite recommendations in the 2010 CONSORT guidelines. A 2015 Cochrane systematic review noted that more than half of the randomized controlled trials looking at the effectiveness of spinal manipulation for neck pain, did not include adverse effects in their reports. However, more recent reports have reported spinal manipulation adverse events to be rare.

=== Risks of neck manipulation ===
The degree of serious risks associated with manipulation of the cervical spine is uncertain, with little evidence of risk of harm but also little evidence of safety either. There is controversy regarding the degree of risk of vertebral artery dissection, which can lead to stroke and death, from cervical manipulation. Several deaths have been associated with this technique and it has been suggested that the relationship is causative, but this is disputed by many chiropractors who believe it is unproven.

Understandably, vascular accidents are responsible for the major criticism of spinal manipulative therapy. However, it has been pointed out that:

critics of manipulative therapy emphasize the possibility of serious injury, especially at the brain stem, due to arterial trauma after cervical manipulation. It has required only the very rare reporting of these accidents to malign a therapeutic procedure that, in experienced hands, gives beneficial results with few adverse side effects.

In very rare instances, the manipulative adjustment to the cervical spine of a vulnerable patient becomes the final intrusive act which results in a very serious consequence.

Edzard Ernst found that there is little evidence for efficacy and some evidence for adverse effects, and due to that, the procedure should be approached with caution, particularly forceful manipulation of the upper spine with rotation.

A 2007 systematic-review found correlations of mild to moderate adverse effects and less frequently with cervical artery dissection, with unknown incidence.

=== Potential for incident under-reporting ===
Statistics on the reliability of incident reporting for injuries related to manipulation of the cervical spine vary. The RAND study assumed that only 1 in 10 cases would have been reported. However, Edzard Ernst surveyed neurologists in Britain for cases of serious neurological complications occurring within 24 hours of cervical spinal manipulation by various types of practitioners; 35 cases had been seen by the 24 neurologists who responded, but none of the cases had been reported. He concluded that under-reporting was close to 100%, rendering estimates "nonsensical." He therefore suggested that "clinicians might tell their patients to adopt a cautious approach and avoid the type of spinal manipulation for which the risk seems greatest: forceful manipulation of the upper spine with a rotational element." The NHS Centre for Reviews and Dissemination stated that the survey had methodological problems with data collection. Both NHS and Ernst noted that bias is a problem with the survey method of data collection.

A 2001 study in the journal Stroke found that vertebrobasilar accidents (VBAs) were five times more likely in those aged less than 45 years who had visited a chiropractor in the preceding week, compared to controls who had not visited a chiropractor. No significant associations were found for those over 45 years. The authors concluded: "While our analysis is consistent with a positive association in young adults... The rarity of VBAs makes this association difficult to study despite high volumes of chiropractic treatment." The NHS notes that this study collected data objectively by using administrative data, involving less recall bias than survey studies, but the data were collected retrospectively and probably contained inaccuracies.

=== Mis-attribution problems ===
Studies of stroke and manipulation do not always clearly identify what professional has performed the manipulation. In some cases this has led to confusion and improper placement of blame. In a 1995 study, chiropractic researcher Allan Terrett, DC, pointed to this problem:

The words chiropractic and chiropractor have been incorrectly used in numerous publications dealing with SMT injury by medical authors, respected medical journals and medical organizations. In many cases, this is not accidental; the authors had access to original reports that identified the practitioner involved as a nonchiropractor. The true incidence of such reporting cannot be determined. Such reporting adversely affects the reader's opinion of chiropractic and chiropractors.

This error was taken into account in a 1999 review of the scientific literature on the risks and benefits of manipulation of the cervical spine (MCS). Special care was taken, whenever possible, to correctly identify all the professions involved, as well as the type of manipulation responsible for any injuries and/or deaths. It analyzed 177 cases that were reported in 116 articles published between 1925 and 1997, and summarized:

The most frequently reported injuries involved arterial dissection or spasm, and lesions of the brain stem. Death occurred in 32 (18%) of the cases. Physical therapists were involved in less than 2% of the cases, and no deaths have been attributed to MCS provided by physical therapists. Although the risk of injury associated with MCS appears to be small, this type of therapy has the potential to expose patients to vertebral artery damage that can be avoided with the use of mobilization (non-thrust passive movements).

In Figure 1 in the review, the types of injuries attributed to manipulation of the cervical spine are shown, and Figure 2 shows the type of practitioner involved in the resulting injury. For the purpose of comparison, the type of practitioner was adjusted according to the findings by Terrett.

The review concluded: "The literature does not demonstrate that the benefits of MCS outweigh the risks. Several recommendations for future studies and for the practice of MCS are discussed."

== History ==
Spinal manipulation is a therapeutic intervention that has roots in folk medicine such as the traditional bone-setting and has been used by various cultures, apparently for thousands of years. Hippocrates, the "father of medicine" used manipulative techniques, as did the ancient Egyptians and many other cultures. A modern re-emphasis on manipulative therapy occurred in the late 19th century in North America with the emergence of osteopathic and chiropractic medicine. Spinal manipulative therapy gained recognition by mainstream medicine during the 1960s.

== Providers ==
In North America, it is most commonly performed by chiropractors, osteopathic physicians, and physical therapists. In Europe, osteopaths, chiropractors, and physiotherapists are the majority providers, although the precise figure varies between countries. In 1992, chiropractors were estimated to perform over 90% of all manipulative treatments given for low back pain treatment in the USA. A 2012 survey in the US found that 99% of the first-professional physical therapy programs that responded were teaching some form of thrust joint manipulation.

== Terminology ==
Manipulation has been known by several other names. Chiropractors often refer to manipulation of a spinal joint as an 'adjustment'. Following the labeling system developed by Geoffery Maitland, manipulation is synonymous with Grade V mobilization. Because of its distinct segmental biomechanics (see section below), the term high velocity low amplitude (HVLA) thrust is often used interchangeably with manipulation. The magnitude of neither force, velocity, or amplitude are regarded as defining attributes.

== Biomechanics ==
Spinal manipulation can be distinguished from other manual therapy interventions such as mobilization by its biomechanics, both kinetics and kinematics.

=== Kinetics ===
Force-time profiles measured during spinal manipulation were originally described as consisting of three distinct phases: the 'preload' (or 'prethrust') phase, the 'thrust' (or 'impulse') phase, and the 'resolution' phase. During the first two phases, force is delivered primarily perpendicular to the articular surface; the preload phase provides a consistent force for several seconds until the targeted spinal segment reaches its end range of motion, a position known as the 'prethrust position'. Evans and Breen added a fourth 'orientation' phase to describe the first period, during which the patient is oriented into the appropriate position in preparation for the preload phase.

=== Kinematics ===
The kinematics of a complete spinal motion segment, when one of its constituent spinal joints is manipulated, are much more complex than the kinematics that occur during manipulation of an independent peripheral synovial joint. However, the events that take place in a manipulated synovial joint are the same, irrespective of whether the synovial joint in the spine or the periphery. Evans and Lucas defined manipulation using these events: "Separation (gapping) of opposing articular surfaces of a synovial joint, caused by a force applied perpendicularly to those articular surfaces, that results in cavitation within the synovial fluid of that joint." The corresponding definition for the mechanical response of a manipulation is: "Separation (gapping) of opposing articular surfaces of a synovial joint that results in cavitation within the synovial fluid of that joint." In turn, the action of a manipulation can be defined as: "A force applied perpendicularly to the articular surfaces."

== Suggested mechanisms ==
The effects of spinal manipulation have been shown to include:

- Temporary relief of musculoskeletal pain
- Shortened time to recover from acute back pain
- Temporary increase in passive range of motion (ROM)
- Physiological effects on the central nervous system (specifically the sympathetic nervous system)
- Altered sensorimotor integration
- No alteration of the position of the sacroiliac joint
- Sham or placebo manipulation

Common side effects of spinal manipulation are characterized as mild to moderate and may include: local discomfort, headache, tiredness, or radiating discomfort.

== See also ==
- Joint manipulation
- Joint mobilization
- Osteopathic manipulation
- Spinal adjustment
