= Muscle energy technique =

Muscle stretching methods used in manual medicine-osteopathy

Muscle Energy Techniques (METs) describes a broad class of manual therapy techniques directed at improving musculoskeletal function or joint function, and improving pain. METs are commonly used by manual therapists, physical therapists, occupational therapist, chiropractors, athletic trainers, osteopathic physicians, and massage therapists. Muscle energy requires the patient to actively use their muscles on request to aid in treatment. Muscle energy techniques are used to treat somatic dysfunction, especially decreased range of motion, muscular hypertonicity, and pain.

Historically, the concept emerged as a form of osteopathic manipulative diagnosis and treatment in which the patient's muscles are actively used on request, from a precisely controlled position, in a specific direction, and against a distinctly executed physician counterforce. It was first described in 1948 by Fred Mitchell Sr, D.O.

== Pathophysiology ==
Injury can occur as a result of trauma, accidents, overuse, strain/sprain, etc., not all of which should be treated with muscle energy. These techniques are most appropriate for the following injury patterns:

- Decreased range of motion secondary to muscular spasticity, rigidity, hypertonicity or hypotonicity. Hypertonicity often follows overuse and can result in altered joint position, increased irritability and decreased elasticity. This injury pattern is often accompanied by a non-specific muscle ache in the area of injury.
- Interneuronal injury—when dysfunction occurs at one joint or segment, the related agonist muscles are also affected. If uncorrected, the antagonistic muscles eventually become involved as well, leading to dysfunction of both muscle groups. This presents as decreased range of motion with pain and/or tenderness in the area.

== Mechanism of action for muscle energy techniques ==
Muscle energy is a direct and active technique, meaning it engages a restrictive barrier and requires the patient's participation for maximal effect. A restrictive barrier describes the limit in range of motion that prevents the patient from reaching the baseline limit in their range of motion. As the patient performs an isometric contraction, the following physiologic changes occur:

- Golgi tendon organ activation directly inhibits agonist muscles.
- A reflexive reciprocal inhibition occurs at the antagonistic muscles.
- As the patient relaxes, agonist and antagonist muscles remain inhibited, allowing the joint to be moved further into the restricted range of motion.

Despite the many claims made regarding the efficacy of these techniques, there are only two peer-reviewed studies that have shown that muscle energy techniques can significantly decrease disability and improve functionality in patients with disorders such as low back pain.

== Indications and contraindications ==
Muscle energy techniques can be employed to reposition a dysfunctional joint and treat the affected musculature. Indications include, but are not limited to: muscular shortening, low back pain, pelvic imbalance, edema, limited range of motion, somatic dysfunction, respiratory dysfunction, cervicogenic headaches, and many others.

These techniques are inappropriate when a patient has injuries such as fractures, avulsion injuries, severe osteoporosis, open wounds, or has metastatic disease. Additionally, because these techniques require active patient participation, they are inappropriate for any patient that is unable to cooperate.

== Techniques ==
Muscle energy techniques can be applied to most areas of the body. According to one textbook, each technique requires eight essential steps:

1. Perform and obtain an accurate structural diagnosis.
2. Engage the restrictive barrier in as many planes as possible.
3. Physician and patient engage in an unyielding counterforce where the patient's force matches the physician's force.
4. The patient's isometric contraction has the correct amount of force, the correct direction of effort (away from the restrictive barrier), and the correct duration (5–10 seconds).
5. Complete relaxation occurs after the muscular effort.
6. The patient is repositioned into the new restrictive barrier in as many planes as possible.
7. Steps 3–6 are repeated approximately 3–5 times or until no further improvement in range of motion is observed.
8. The structural diagnosis is repeated to evaluate if the dysfunction has resolved or improved.

=== Isolytic muscle contraction ===
Isolytic contraction is when a muscle contracts while external forces cause it to lengthen. For example, during a controlled lowering of the weight in a biceps curl, the biceps are undergoing isolytic contraction. In osteopathic manipulative medicine, it is used for the treatment of fibrotic or chronically shortened myofascial tissues. The applied counterforce is greater than the patient force, resulting in lengthening of the myofascial tissues.

== Types ==
There are several different types of muscle energy techniques:

1. Post-Isometric relaxation: Treat by engaging the restrictive barrier in all planes.
2. Reciprocal inhibition: Treat by contracting the antagonistic muscles, which causes the agonist muscle to relax through the reciprocal inhibition reflex arc.
3. Joint mobilization using muscle force: Use muscle contraction to restore range of motion in a joint.
4. Oculocephalogyric reflex: Treat cervical/truncal muscles by using extraocular muscle contraction.
5. Respiratory assistance: Use the patient's voluntary respiratory motions to treat a somatic dysfunction. Commonly used in treating inhalation rib dysfunctions.
6. Crossed extensor reflex: Use crossed extensor reflex to treat muscular injuries. For example, contraction of a muscle on the right side leads to relaxation of the same muscle on the left side.

=== Muscle Energy of the Ribs ===
'Muscle Energy of the Ribs' is used to treat dysfunctional ribs. When treating each rib, assistance with local muscles is elicited as follows:

Rib	Muscle	Visual reference	Method of activation
1	Anterior and middle scalenes		Look straight ahead and lift head anterior
2	Posterior scalenes		Turn head 30 degrees away and lift anterior
3-5	Pectoralis minor		Push ipsilateral elbow towards opposite ASIS.
6-8	Serratus Anterior		Push arm anteriorly
9-11	Latissimus dorsi		Patient pushes the ipsilateral arm into adduction against resistance.
12	Quadratus Lumborum		Patient pushes the ipsilateral arm into adduction against resistance.

== Effectiveness ==
A 2015 Cochrane review concluded that Muscle Energy Technique is not effective for patients with low back pain, and that the quality of the research testing the effectiveness of MET is poor.
