= Vertebral artery test =

Physical exam

The Vertebral Artery Test or Wallenberg Test is a physical exam for vertebral artery insufficiency.

Commonly, the VA test involves cervical spine motion to an end-range position of rotation, extension or a combination of both. At this point, the physician assesses for vertebrobasilar insufficiency (VBI) symptoms. If the patient has VBI symptoms during the test, it is considered a positive result and a contraindication for cervical manipulation.

The specifics of VA testing vary among authors.

The test is positive if the patient complains of dizziness, visual changes, or nystagmus occurs.
