= Strain and counterstrain =

Within manual therapy, Strain-Counterstrain is a type of "passive positional release" created in 1955 by Lawrence Jones, D.O. It is a hands-on treatment that attempts to alleviate muscle and connective tissue tightness by the use of very specific treatment positions held for 90 seconds (can be held for up to 3 minutes in neurological patients). During the procedure, the involved tissue is "slackened" causing a relaxation of the "spasm" which, in turn, allows local areas of inflammation, trapped within the painful tissue to dissipate. Following this "release" there is an immediate reduction of pain and tension in the involved tissue. This relaxation aims to restore normal joint mobility and release other structures in the region that may have been compressed. This gentle and painless technique has been reported to be a very effective treatment for a wide variety of orthopedic conditions such as headaches, fibromyalgia, sciatica, tendinitis, chronic neck pain, and post-surgical conditions. It is not supported by evidence-based physical therapy practice.
