= Anna Cervantes =

Anna Cervantes is an NPC Figure bodybuilding competitor.

She started her competition career in Mexico competing in fitness competitions and quickly qualified for the national stage in Mexico. She placed in 1st place in the selectivo nacional (national qualifier) to compete in the Ms. Mexico contest. She placed second in the Ms. Mexico in her first year, and many felt that she should have won, but finished in second place because it was her first year competing.

She competed in Ms. Fitness World 2000 in Las Vegas. After finding out that she had a degenerative disk disorder in her back she had to retire from the grueling training and preparation needed to compete.

She stepped on stage in 2003 and placed third in her first competition in San Diego after three years of not competing.

After the show in 2003 due to back ailments, she had to rest from the rigors of hard training for competitions to work on getting her back in better condition.

In 2009, she decided to step onstage this time and decided to do a full series of competitions in NPC Figure. She qualified for her first national competition in July 2009 USA's Nationals.
