= Journal of Manual & Manipulative Therapy =

- Discipline: Manual therapy
- Language: English
- Edited by: Jean-Michel Brismée

Publication details
- History: 1993-present
- Publisher: Taylor & Francis
- Frequency: 6/year

Standard abbreviations
- ISO 4: J. Man. Manip. Ther.

Indexing
- ISSN: 1066-9817 (print); 2042-6186 (web)
- OCLC no.: 60624593

Links
- Journal homepage; Online access; Online archive

The Journal of Manual & Manipulative Therapy is a peer-reviewed medical journal covering the field of orthopaedic manual therapy, including clinical research, therapeutic practice, and academic training. It is the official journal of the American Academy of Orthopaedic Manual Physical Therapists and has partnerships with the McKenzie Institute International and OMT-France. It was established in 1992 and is published by Taylor & Francis. The editor-in-chief is Jean-Michel Brismée, PT, ScD (Texas Tech University Health Sciences Center). He was preceded by Stanley Paris, John Medeiros, Peter Huijbregts, Chad Cook, and Dan Vaughn.

== Abstracting and indexing ==
The journal is abstracted and indexed in:

- EBSCO databases
- CINAHL
- Embase
- Emerging Sources Citation Index
- Index Medicus/MEDLINE/PubMed
- Scopus
