= Fascial manipulation =

Form of physiotherapy

Fascial Manipulation is a manual therapy technique developed by Italian physiotherapist Luigi Stecco in the 1980s, aimed at evaluating and treating global fascial dysfunction by restoring normal motion or gliding to the fascial system.

The method is based on a biomechanical model which places emphasis on the significant role of fascia, particularly deep muscular fascia, in treating musculoskeletal disorders, and internal organ dysfunction. The fascial system consists of a three-dimensional continuum of soft, collagen-containing, loose, and dense fibrous connective tissues that permeate the body.

This concept later served as an inspiration for the Fascial Net Plastination Project, to which Stecco’s daughter Carla Stecco contributed as a scientific advisor.

== History ==
In the 1980s, Stecco focused his fascial research on the treatment of recurring pain that could not be alleviated by other methods, and the recovery time of the injury. He developed a soft tissue manual technique aimed at treating myofascial dysfunction, and consequently, musculoskeletal disease. He named the technique Fascial Manipulation. He continued to focus his research on the method for the next four decades. Later on, it progressed with his children's collaboration, Antonio Stecco at New York University School of Medicine and Carla Stecco at Padua University.

Stecco has written numerous books on Fascial Manipulation throughout his career. The idea was first coined by him in a 1988 booklet where he highlighted the similarities between myofascial sequences, and the energy channels, known as meridians which helps in identifying the painful regions with respect to points that are to be treated. Followed by this, he presented his findings on the Neuro-myofascial unit at the First International Symposium on Myofascial Pain and Fibromyalgia. He published his first book in 1990 entitled, Pain and Myo-Fascial Sequences that described the myofascial sequences, and the reflected pain across the fascia. The key fusion points, diagonals, and movement patterns were then addressed in the 2002 book, Fascial Manipulation for Musculoskeletal Pain. Later on, he formulated a practical manual of the Stecco Method with Carla Stecco, and wrote the practical manual for internal organs that focused on internal dysfunction, which was published in 2007.

== Conceptual basis ==
Stecco considers the myofascial system as a 3D continuum, and believes that deep fascia consisting of layers of connective tissue that both cover and are within muscles throughout the body is essential as a coordinating, uniting, and connecting unit for the myofascial network. This system is related to proprioceptors and mechanoreceptors that report information to the central nervous system. An important receptor in muscles is known as the muscle spindle cell that resides in the fascia. In order to function properly, the receptors must be able to be stretched. Fascial Manipulation works on restoring the function of these receptors.

The proprioceptive role of the fascial system has also been evaluated by assessing the anatomical features of ankle retinacula. In a 2010 research study, it was revealed that retinaculum (a thickening of fascia) contains proprioceptors controlling foot and ankle movement. This study highlighted the morphological evidence of the fascial system acting as an integrative unit in the peripheral control of joint mobility.

Soft tissues in human bodies are covered by layers of fascia that due to trauma, surgery, poor posture over time and overuse become densified creating local or global restrictions. Hyaluronan (HA) accumulation, and the role of HA in the musculoskeletal system with a particular focus on fascia has been analyzed. One of the chief functions of HA is to act as a lubricant. In the muscle system, it is present in loose connective tissue that is between muscle and fascia allowing normal movement. Due to injury, prolonged tension of the HA molecules can aggregate increasing its viscosity and irritating the free nerve endings. The foundation of Fascial Manipulation is the recognition of particular localized fascial points that are causative of restricted movement. The recovery of the movement is achieved by appropriately manipulating the specific fascial points densified due to fragmented HA molecules.

This method states that unidentified tension is created once the normal gliding between the endo-fascial fibers layers and interfascial planes become affected. The alteration in proprioceptive afferents leads to non-physiologic movements at joints which results in inflammation and pain. Fascial Manipulation posits that deep muscular fascia not only co-ordinates different body segments, but also organizes unidirectional motor units to create myofascial units. The biomechanical model of FM is supported by evidence of numerous anatomical, and histological studies that examine the role of fascia in musculoskeletal disorders. FM aims to target the deep fascia such as the aponeurotic fascia, epimysium and retinacula. Weiss, and Kalichman noted in a 2021 research study assessing the potential role of fascia and revealed that deep fascia could serve as a pinpoint of pain for numerous pain syndromes.

== Technique ==
Stecco has marked the critical points in the deep fascia through research on cadaver dissections in the recent years with the collaborations of Carla Stecco, and Antonio Stecco. The technique of this method focuses on creating manual friction on the specific localized deep muscular fascia which are often situated away from the pain site.

For Fascial Manipulation, a thorough case history, especially including past injuries and surgeries is taken. The history is considered as crucial to determine whether the painful area is the cause of the pain or whether the painful area is compensating for a previous situation i.e., old ankle injury causing knee or hip pain. Next, movement testing is used to help determine painful ranges of motion, and to help decide on the specific fascial plain requiring treatment. The final decision as to treatment site is based primarily on the palpation of dense fascial acupuncture meridian points where the most receptors are located.

Fascial Manipulation targets fascial points known as centers of coordination (CC’s) which help control muscle spindles that regulate unidirectional movement along sequences and centers of fusion (CF’S) that regulates motion in diagonal and spiral complex movements. Fascial Manipulation argues that the buildup of lack of shear within CCs, and CFs can adversely affect muscle, ligament and joint function including functional visceral conditions. Once the rigidity is relieved, and proper glide is acquired between the fascial layers, and surrounding tissues, reduction in pain, and eventual healing is observed.

== Effectiveness ==
Studies on the fascial manipulation (FM) method provide a statistical, and clinical significance of this technique on joint instability, skeletal and muscular pain arising from abnormal fascia function. In an early pilot study characterizing the clinical implications of applying Fascial Manipulation technique for the treatment of musculoskeletal pain, it was indicated from a study consisting of 28 subjects with chronic posterior brachial pain that the Fascial Manipulation technique could lead to effective reduction of chronic pain. Later on, a systematic review of research studies from 2005 to 2019 that followed Stecco’s Fascial Manipulation (FM) model was also conducted, and it was indicated that significant improvements were reported suggesting the effectiveness of FM in improving the pain in study subjects.

The effects of the FM method for the treatment of rotator cuff tear disease have also been assessed in post stroke patients. It was demonstrated that mechanoreceptors in the deep fascia are activated with movement. However, rise in hyaluronan (HA) leads to an increase in deep fascia viscosity, which inhibits gliding of fascia, preventing normal muscle function.

The effectiveness of Fascial Manipulation (FM) method for the treatment of carpal tunnel syndrome as compared to treatment with Low-Level Laser Therapy (LLLT) has also been measured. FM method was characterized as a valid alternative to LLT since the subjects receiving FM reported reduced pain perception, even after three-month follow up.

A research study assessing the post-surgery pain focused on the effect of Fascial Manipulation for persistent knee pain following anterior cruciate ligament (ACL) and meniscus repair. In a 32-year-old male patient, clinically significant improvements were measured in follow ups at three, six, twelve, and twenty-four months. In another randomized controlled trial consisting of patients with a total hip arthroplasty, Fascial Manipulation was employed as a post-surgical care therapy, and compared to the standard care. It was demonstrated that with only two Fascial Manipulation sessions, significant improvements in pain reduction, and increased muscular capacity were measured. It was also proved as an effective, safe, and cost-effective approach to reduce facial pain, and has shown improvement in muscle force, and motor functionality.

An early single blinded randomized controlled trial, showed that Fascial Manipulation (FM) reported significant improvements, both from a clinical and statistical viewpoint as compared to usual physiotherapy alone for the treatment of chronic aspecific low back pain (CALBP).
