= Degenerative lumbosacral stenosis =

Medical condition in dogs

- Other names: Cauda equina syndrome

Degenerative lumbosacral stenosis (DLSS), also known as cauda equina syndrome, is a pathologic degeneration in the lumbosacral disk in dogs; affecting the articulation, nerve progression, tissue and joint connections of the disk. This degeneration causes compressions in soft tissues and nerve root locations in the ultimate caudal area of the medulla, causing neuropathic pain in the lumbar vertebrae.

== Signs and symptoms ==
DLSS has been found to affect dogs between the ages of 7 and 8, males ranging twice as higher than females in the research area. Medium to large-sized working breeds with high rates of activity are mostly affected by this disease, the German Shepherd breed being the most common on DLSS diagnosis.

The Merck Veterinary Manual also notes that German Shepherds with congenital transitional vertebrae are at increased risk, that signs typically begin at 3 to 7 years of age, and that tail weakness and incontinence can occur. Pain when the lumbosacral joint is palpated or extended is the most consistent finding on examination.

Common symptoms in dogs are physical difficulties in normal daily activities, such as:

- Mild to severe pain when walking (dragged hind limbs).
- Discomfort when ascending or descending stairs.
- Lumbar disturbances when resting or lying down.
- Unwillingness to perform exercise.
- Urinal and defecation discomfort.

Behavioural problems will also be presented in dogs affected by DLSS, due to the pain they suffer on their lower back. It has been researched that there is a positive correlation regarding a dog's behaviour with the amount of lumbar vertebrae that are affected by this disease, respectively showing that behavioural disturbances are more likely to appear with dogs that have 3+ affected vertebrae. Symptoms such as anxiety, sudden loss of appetite, or mild aggressiveness when performing physical activities can become clear signs of this disease.

== Research ==
DLSS is associated with behavioural problems depending on how much the disease affects the dog; in other words, the more tissue and bone that is affected by DLSS, the more reluctant the dog will be to perform any kind of physical activity. Its most general overview and research ground for understanding this pathological disease takes place in the military, since dogs who take part in the special forces (German and Dutch Shepherd, Labrador Retriever and Belgian Malinois being the most proper breeds) are widely studied as they progress through their incredibly active life. Those affected by DLSS, generally diagnosed in their retirement period, show a wide range of decreased activity when performing certain demanding tasks that require physical stress, thus, becoming crucial exemplars for lumbar diseases.

== Diagnosis ==
DLSS is commonly identified through magnetic resonance imaging (MRI) or computed tomography (CT) due to their precision in recognising abnormalities in soft tissue and small bone structures.

== Treatment ==
Medical treatment is necessary to correct this lumbar disease, generally varying from anti-inflammatory drugs (lacking steroids, such as: tramadol and gabapentin) to surgical correction; surgery being the most effective of course. Dorsal Laminectomy is the most common procedure for DLSS treatment, which implies the decompression or des-inflammation of soft tissues and nerve roots.↵Surgical fusion of the lumbosacral vertebrates has also been found to improve the affected vertebrae, since it reduces motion by eliminating certain nerve compressions located in the vertebral canal. Specific facetectomy (fat surgery) can also be performed in order to maintain stability in the affected joint tissue.

Alternative conservative or non-surgical treatment is also a convenient option with dogs that have not fully developed Degenerative Lumbosacral Stenosis; ranging from regular walks to underwater exercises that aid the affected lumbar vertebrae decompress and tone the corresponding muscle. Statistically, physiotherapy has a success rate of 79% in all affected patients. If there is no surgical intervention, oral tramadol and alternative gabapentin have shown to decrease the neuropathological pain dogs suffer when affected by the disease.
