= Natural apophyseal glides =

Spinal physical therapy treatment technique

- Specialty: Physical therapy

Natural apophyseal glides (NAGS) refers to a spinal physical therapy treatment technique developed by Brian Mulligan.

== Technique ==
NAGS involves a mid- to end-range facet joint mobilisation applied anterocranially along the plane of treatment within the desired joint, combined with a small amount of manual traction. The purpose of this treatment is to increase movement within the spine, and decrease symptomatic pain.

== Sustained natural apophyseal glides ==
Sustained natural apophyseal glides (SNAGS) are a separate technique involving a combination of a sustained facet glide with active motion, which is then followed by overpressure.

== Clinical evidence ==
A 2010 study concluded that whilst both NAGS and SNAGS showed signs of effectiveness, SNAGS demonstrated greater statistically significant efficacy over NAGS in reducing pain and disability in subjects with chronic neck pain. Another study suggested that Mulligan's mobilisation (i.e. NAGS and SNAGS), Maitland's mobilisation and the McKenzie approach were all effective in relieving pain and improving range of motion in cases of chronic cervical spondylosis with unilateral radiculopathy.

A 2008 randomised controlled trial by Reid et al. suggested a statistically significant correlation between SNAGS treatment and reduced dizziness, cervical pain and disability caused by cervical dysfunction, whilst another randomised controlled trial in 2007 by Hall et al. suggested that a self-sustained C1-C2 SNAG technique was effective in managing cervicogenic headache. A 2008 study by Moutzouri et al. suggested that SNAG mobilisation did not demonstrate significant effectiveness to increase the range of motion in patients with low back pain.

== See also ==
- Passive accessory intervertebral movements
- Passive physiological intervertebral movements
