= Lumbar provocative discography =

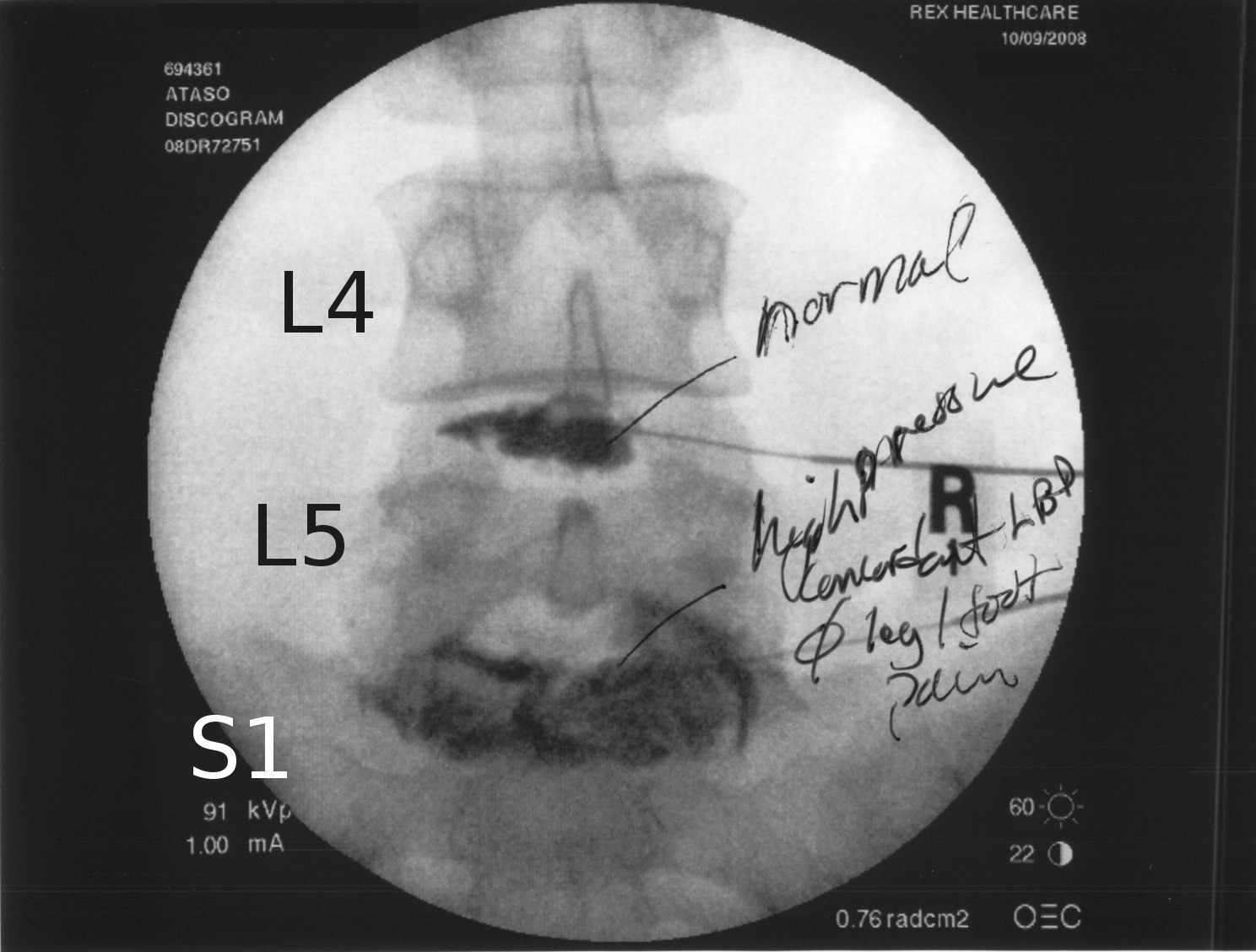
- Lumbar provocative discography showing a degenerated disc, L5-S1 with normal disc L4-L5
- Other codes: CPT 62290 (lumbar/sacral); CPT 62291 (Cervical/Thoracic); CPT 72295 radiological supervision (lumbar/sacral); CPT 72285 radiological supervision (cervical/thoracic)

Lumbar provocative discography (also referred to as "discography" or discogram) is an invasive diagnostic procedure for evaluation for intervertebral disc pathology. It is usually reserved for persons with persistent, severe low back pain (LBP) who have abnormal spaces between vertebrae on magnetic resonance imaging (MRI), where other diagnostic tests have failed to reveal clear confirmation of a suspected disc as the source of pain, and surgical intervention is being considered.

== Uses ==
Spinal MRI is the imaging of choice to investigate the spine and intervertebral discs. Meanwhile, lumbar discography is used to demonstrate degeneration and herniation of lumbar intervertebral discs by injecting a dye into the nucleus pulposus of the discs. The procedure is also used to reproduce pain back pain for those who have such symptoms. Lumbar discography is also used to access the response of a subject to anaesthetic injection. Other uses include suspected discogenic pain without radicular sign (pain travelling to lower limbs along a dermatome) and confirmation of normal intervertebral discs above and below a site before spinal fusion. However, evidence supporting the usefulness of lumbar discography in recognizing intervertebral disc problems is limited. There is no role for cervical or thoracic discography in diagnosing disc pathologies at the cervical or thoracic regions.

For those with local or distant sepsis, lumbar discography can add to the risk of infective discitis. Those with co-morbities that caused them not to be suitable candidate for surgery is also relatively contraindicated for this procedure.

== Procedure ==
Non-ionic contrast media such as iopamidol and iohexol are used. Needles are inserted through the back into the disc near the suspect area, guided by fluoroscopic imaging. Fluid is then injected to pressurize the disc, and any pain responses are recorded.

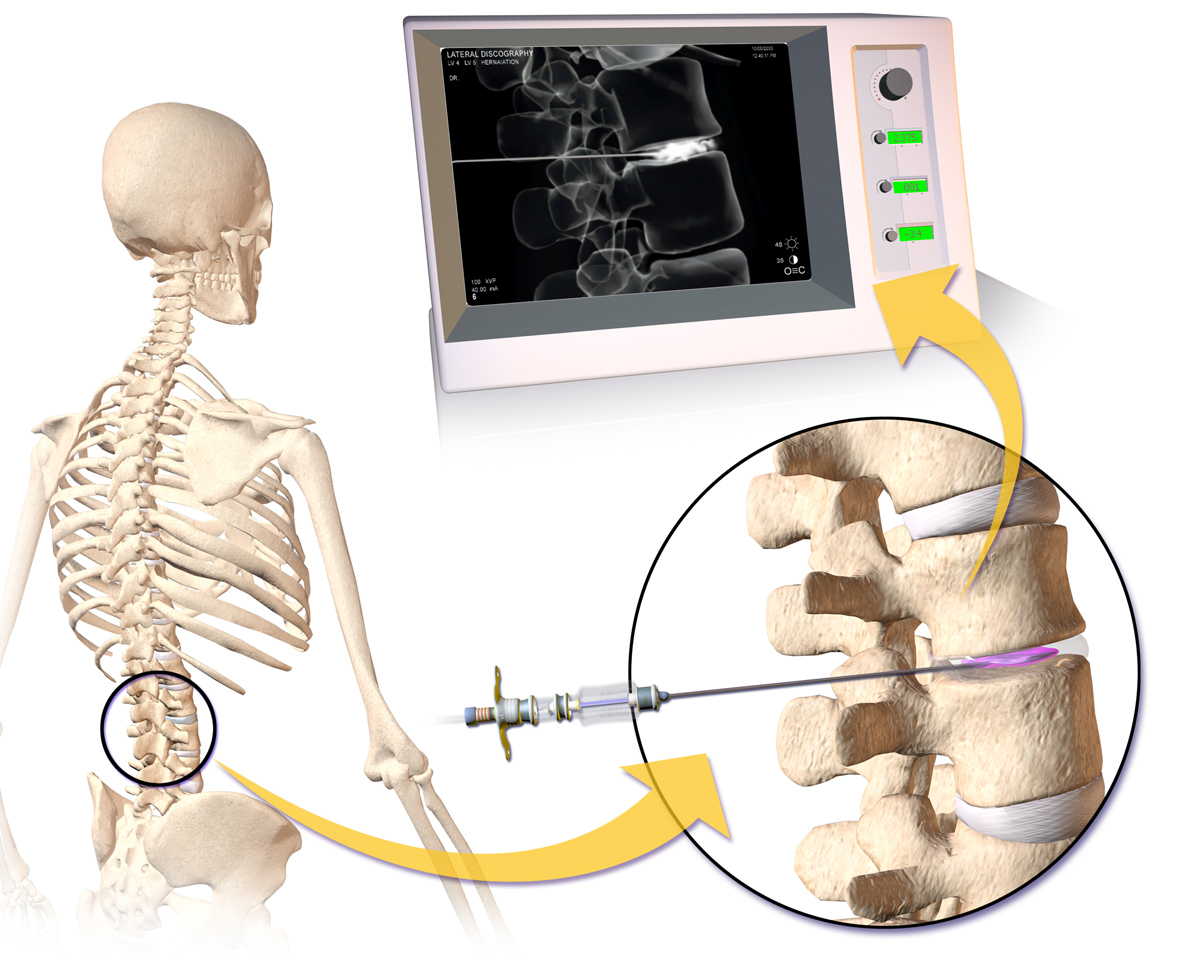
Lumbar Discography.

This is repeated in random order for the various discs, without the patient knowing which disc is pressurized. This can be used to detect patients who may be exaggerating their symptoms, or to assess their pain response and hence their suitability for recovery from possible surgery (often a Discectomy).

A contrast agent is introduced, and after the procedure, a CT scan identifies leakage from the discs to identify any spinal disc herniation.

Possible complications include nerve damage, discitis, an infection of the disc. Strong antibiotics are usually administered as a precaution.

Its use in predicting surgical outcomes is sometimes controversial.

== History ==
Lindgren from Scandinavia first performed a puncture of normal intervertebral disc for diagnostic purposes in 1941.
