= McKenzie method =

Method of physical therapy

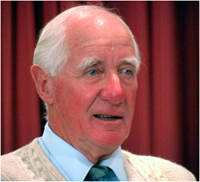
- Robin Anthony McKenzie
- Specialty: Physical therapy

The McKenzie method is a technique primarily used in physical therapy. It was developed in the late 1950s by New Zealand physiotherapist Robin McKenzie. In 1981 he launched the concept which he called "Mechanical Diagnosis and Therapy (MDT)" – a system encompassing assessment, diagnosis and treatment for the spine and extremities. MDT categorises patients' complaints not on an anatomical basis, but subgroups them by the clinical presentation of patients.

McKenzie exercises involve spinal extension, flexion, lateral shift, combined extension with lateral shift, and rotation with flexion motion exercises. The prescribed movement for the patient will all depend on how the patient responds to the movement. Patients often respond well spinal extension, however, the method does not shy away from other directions.

== Effectiveness ==
There is some evidence that the McKenzie method is more effective than certain alternatives at reducing pain and disability in chronic (but not acute) lower back pain. A 2019 systematic review found evidence that the method could reduce chronic lower back pain in the short term and enhance function in the longer term, but that most studies of the treatment had methodological flaws, such as small sample sizes and a lack of blinding. Similarly, a 2022 meta-analysis found that "classification" approaches to lower back pain (of which the McKenzie system is one) may be slightly more effective than alternatives, but that the evidence is insufficient to support these approaches over others. In subacute (i.e., between acute and chronic) lower back pain, the McKenzie method has not been shown to produce a significant reduction of symptoms nor disability. Moreover, exercises targeting midline strengthening, as used in the McKenzie method, are no more helpful for lower back pain than conventional flexion and extension exercises.

== History ==
In 1956, McKenzie was treating a patient experiencing pain. The patient lay down on McKenzie's treatment table, and after bending backward for five minutes, reported an improvement in their symptoms. This led McKenzie to experiment with specific movement patterns to treat chronic lower back pain and bring about the movement of pain towards the spine, which he called "centralisation". He later developed a classification system to categorise spinal pain problems, and published books on the topic, including Treat Your Own Back (1980).

The McKenzie method was commonly used worldwide in the late 2000s in diagnosis and treatment of low back pain, and peripheral joint complaints. The International MDT Research Foundation, based in the United States, funds research to demonstrate the effectiveness and scope of action of the McKenzie method.

=== Centralisation ===
The McKenzie method employs the principle that exercises that encourage disc centralization should be promoted, and exercises that encourage disc peripheralization should be avoided. Centralisation occurs when pain symptoms centered away from the mid-line of the spine migrate towards it. This migration of pain symptoms to the centre of the lower back is considered a sign of progress in the McKenzie method. Extension exercises are sometimes referred to as McKenzie exercises for this reason. According to the McKenzie method, movements and exercises that produce centralisation are beneficial, whereas movements that move pain away from the spinal mid-line are detrimental.
