= Neuroreflexotherapy =

Alternative medical treatment for low back pain

Neuroreflexotherapy (NRT) is a type of alternative medicine treatment used for some cases of low back pain (LBP). Small pieces of metal are placed just under the surface of the skin in the ear and back, and are intended to interrupt the neural pain processes. Totally, there are three publications devoted to this method in the world medical science [Kovacs FM, 1993, 1997, 2002]. They are published by the same first author and claim almost absolute efficacy of the therapy and lack of effect of other treatments. Also, three reviews repeat the definition of the method and the claimed results.

== Efficacy ==
A 2005 Cochrane review said that while some limited research reported "surprising" results for the efficacy of this therapy in treating nonspecific LBP, a lack of confirming research made it impossible to reach general conclusions about its overall efficacy. A note from the Co‐Editors of the review says that the conclusions would be more sound "if similar evidence was available from RCTs conducted in other countries, with other care providers and different researchers. The very large positive response in the intervention group compared to the placebo group is unusual for trials in chronic back pain. ... Therefore, ... there is no strong evidence that it will work as well outside the specialty clinics in Spain."

== Side effects ==
Negative skin reactions have been described including dermatitis and skin infections.

== Technique ==
In the procedure, small pieces of metal are placed in the skin of the back and ear: surgical staples are placed through the outer layer of skin, and burins are implanted just beneath the skin surface. The pieces are either removed or fall out on their own between two weeks and three months after implantation. The procedure is done on an outpatient basis, and takes about one hour to complete. A 2005 review did not find reports of pain or scarring associated with the procedure.

== Mechanism of action ==
The pieces of metal are placed in locations believed to be in neural pain transmission pathways in order to interrupt them. The locations chosen are specific dermatomes in the back - regions served by a particular nerve root - along with what Marlowe describes as associated "referred tender points" in the ear. This combination of locations is theorized to reduce pain by interfering with the neural pain transmission and processing pathways, interrupting nerve signals that tighten the lower back muscles, and reducing neurogenic inflammation. The metal pieces in the lower back stimulate the release of peptides that inhibit the generation of pain messages, and the ones in the ear are theorized to activate pain-relieving mechanisms in the brain.

== History ==
Several research works in neurophysiology and other fields of medicine were carried out by Prof. Dr. René Kovacs in the second half of the 20th century in France and Spain. These works led to Neuroreflexotherapy (NRT) development which is continued by the Kovacs Foundation since 1986.
