= Zero balancing =

Alternative medicine devised by Frederick "Fritz" Smith in the 1970s

Alternative therapy

Zero balancing is a type of manual therapy devised by American osteopathic doctor Frederick "Fritz" Smith in the 1970s. Drawing from principles of osteopathy, Chinese medicine and Structural Integration, Smith proposed that the energy field within the human body could be affected by manual manipulations, thus bringing health benefits. The practice teaches that currents of energy are stored within the human skeleton, and that these affect both physical and mental wellbeing.

Zero balancing is pseudoscientific. Article writer and lawyer Jann Bellamy places zero balancing among many vitalism-based practices that exist within the "cornucopia of quackery" of massage therapy. Bellamy writes that in the United States the public are inadequately protected from such practices because of the lack of independent oversight; instead regulation is carried out within a "closed loop" system by massage-focused organizations. Edzard Ernst wrote in 2018 that zero balancing did not appear to have evidence published for its efficacy.

== Description ==
According to Frederick Smith, the founder of zero balancing,

Zero balancing teaches that the deepest currents of energy are in bone, that memory can be held in tissue, that energy fields in the body underlie mind, body and emotions, and that imbalances in the field precede pathology.

The Zero Balancing Health Association say that zero balancing "uses skilled touch to address the relationship between energy and structures of the body".

The client stays fully clothed for the duration of the session in zero balancing. It includes techniques such as gentle lifting, pressing, rotating, and stretching of different body parts, with particular attention paid to the bone.

== History ==
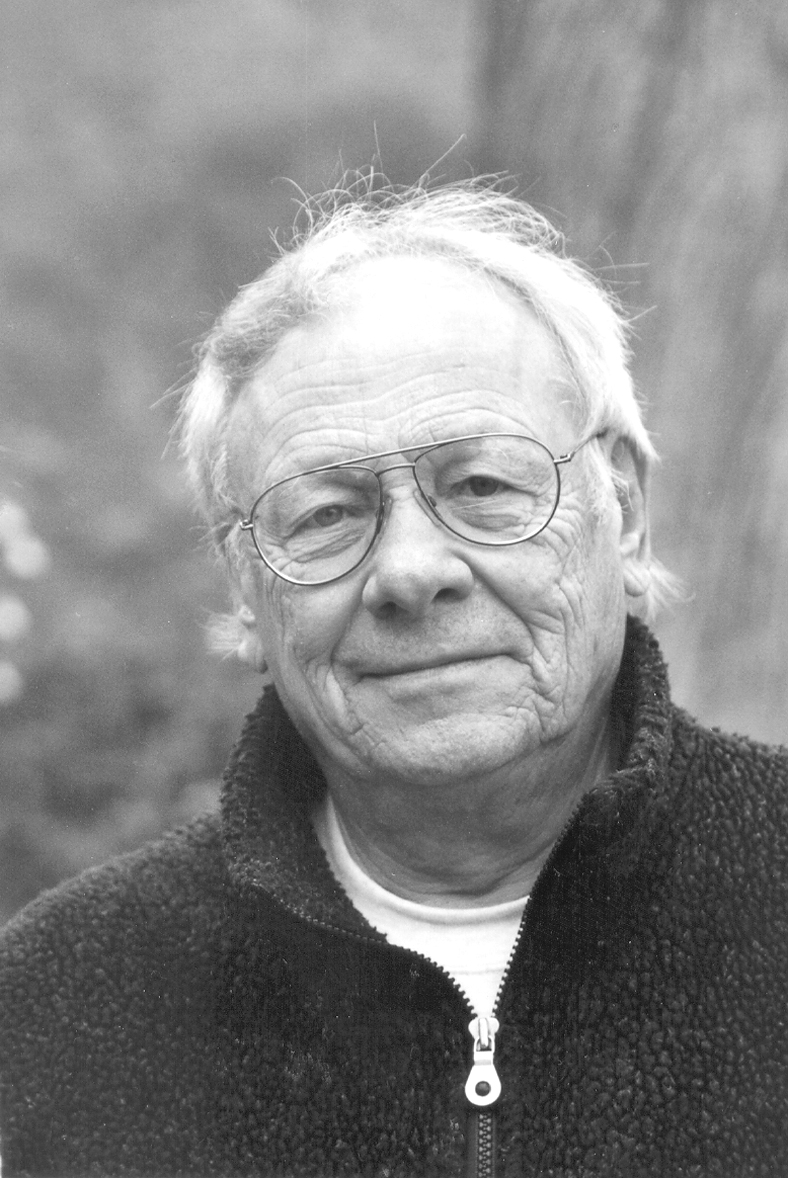
Fritz Smith, founder of zero balancing

Frederick Smith created zero balancing in the early 1970s, after studying acupuncture and being inspired by eastern philosophies. Smith also had a background in other alternative therapies, including meditation, taoism, and yoga. His aim in creating the therapy was to "integrate the differing truths of eastern and western models of healing".

== Training ==
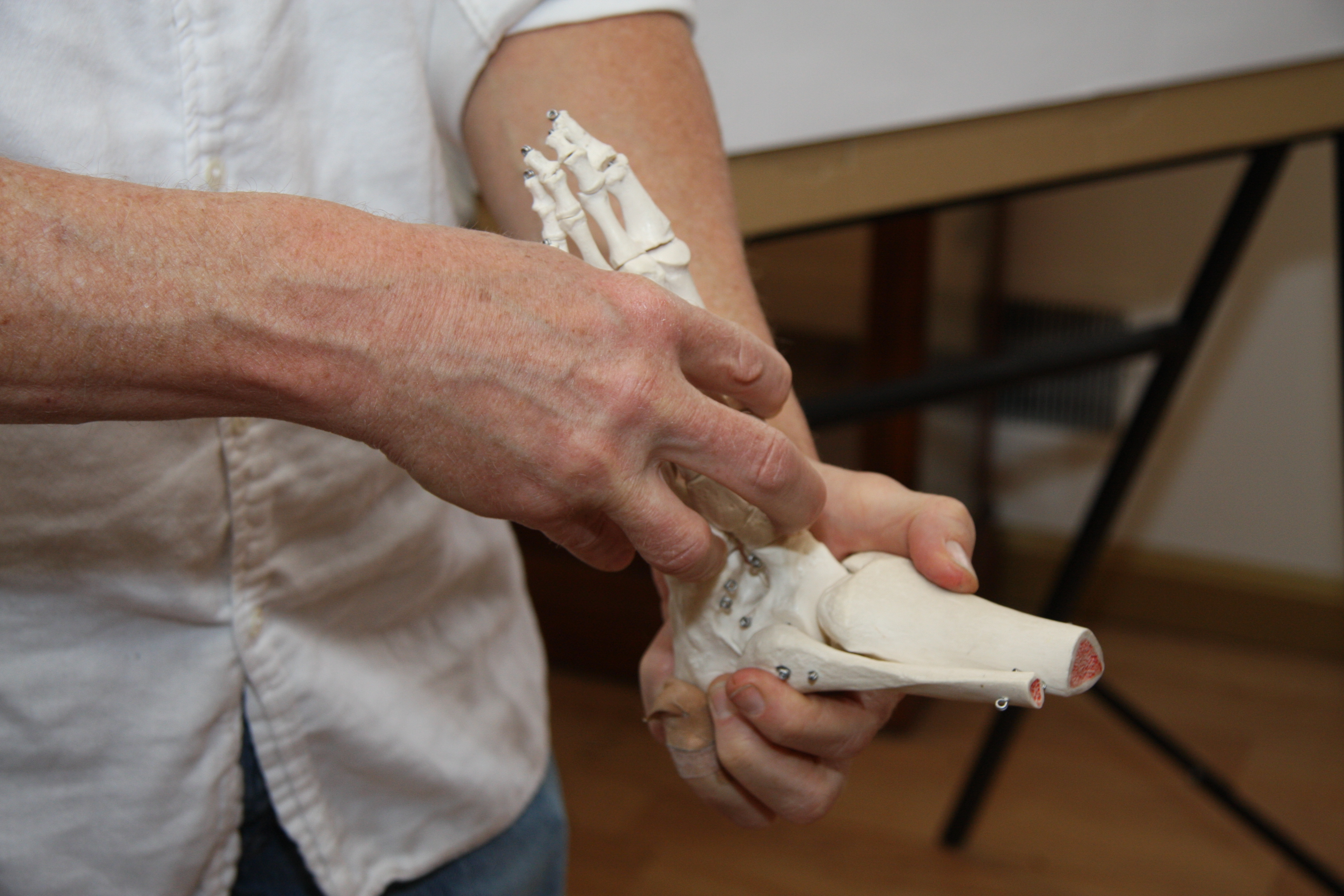
Tutorial image showing common element with zero balancing's work on the bones of the feet

According to founder Frederick Smith in a 2009 interview, there are more than 500 practitioners internationally, and another 500 in training, with most in England or the United States. Practitioners are trained in its use as an adjunct skill, though it is also practiced as a self standing therapy.

== See also ==
- Chiropractic
- Rolfing
