= Waddell's signs =

- Differential diagnosis: low back pain

Waddell's signs are a group of physical signs, first described in a 1980 article in Spine, and named for the article's principal author, Professor Gordon Waddell (1943–2017), a Scottish Orthopedic Surgeon. Waddell's signs may indicate non-organic or psychological component to chronic low back pain. Historically they have also been used to detect malingering in patients with back pain. While testing takes less than one minute, it has been described as time-consuming and alternatives have been proposed.

== Use of Waddell's signs ==
Waddell, et al. (1980) described five categories of signs:

- Tenderness tests: superficial and diffuse tenderness and/or nonanatomic tenderness
- Simulation tests: these are based on movements which produce pain, without actually causing that movement, such as axial loading and pain on simulated rotation
- Distraction tests: positive tests are rechecked when the patient's attention is distracted, such as a straight leg raise test
- Regional disturbances: regional weakness or sensory changes which deviate from accepted neuroanatomy
- Overreaction: subjective signs regarding the patient's demeanor and reaction to testing

Any individual sign marks its category as positive. When three or more categories were positive, the finding was considered clinically significant. However, assessing the patient on the basis of overreaction has raised concerns regarding observer bias and idiosyncrasies related to the patient's culture. Consequently, a practitioner may assess the patient on the remaining four categories, with two or more positive categories being considered clinically significant.

One or two Waddell's signs can often be found even when there is not a strong non-organic component to pain. Three or more are positively correlated with high scores for depression, hysteria and hypochondriasis on the Minnesota Multiphasic Personality Inventory.

== Criticism ==
Although Waddell's signs can detect a non-organic component to pain, they do not exclude an organic cause. Clinically significant Waddell scores are considered indicative only of symptom magnification or pain behavior, and have been misused in medical and medico-legal contexts. Waddell's signs are not considered a de facto indicator of deception for the purpose of financial gain.

In a 2003 review, Fishbain, et al. stated that Waddell's signs do not reliably distinguish organic from psychological pain but instead tend to underestimate the amount of pain that is actually experienced. In a 2004 review, Fishbain, et al. concluded, "there was little evidence for the claims of an association between Waddell signs and secondary gain and malingering. The preponderance of the evidence points to the opposite: no association".

In 2010, a neuroanatomical basis of Waddell's signs has been proposed which argues that since the brain is organic, and even society is composed of a group of organic beings, the term "nonorganic" should be replaced by a term put forward by Chris Spanswick in 1997, "behavioral responses to physical examination." With the possible exception of cogwheel rigidity, these are best understood as neuroanatomical maladaptations to long-continued pain and, as Waddell and colleagues have stressed, do not indicate faking or malingering but rather that there are psychosocial issues that militate against successfully treating low back pain by lumbar discectomy, and which in themselves require other treatment.
