= Passive accessory intervertebral movements =

- Specialty: Physical therapy

Passive accessory intervertebral movements (PAIVM) refers to a spinal physical therapy assessment and treatment technique developed by Geoff Maitland. The purpose of PAIVM is to assess the amount and quality of movement at various intervertebral levels, and to treat pain and stiffness of the cervical and lumbar spine.

== Technique ==
During assessment, the aim of PAIVM is to reproduce patient symptoms, and assess the endfeel of cervical movement, quality of resistance, behaviour of pain throughout the range of movement, and observe any muscle spasm. A posterior to anterior force of varying strength is applied by the therapist either centrally onto the spinous process, or unilaterally on either the left or right articular pillar. As a treatment technique, pain is treated by oscillations of small amplitude short of resistance, whilst stiffness is treated by larger amplitudes 50% into resistance.

=== Contraindications ===
The technique is contraindicated by bone disease, malignancy, pregnancy, vertebral artery insufficiency, active ankylosing spondylitis, rheumatoid arthritis, spinal instability, acute irritation or compression of the nerve root, and recent whiplash.

== Clinical evidence ==
A 2005 study by Abbott et al. suggested that as an assessment technique, PAIVMs are highly specific, but not sensitive, in the detection of lumbar segmental instability. A 1993 study by Watson and Trott suggested that PAIVM examinations are reliable when identifying symptomatic vertebral joints when assessing for cervicogenic headache.

== See also ==
- Passive physiological intervertebral movements
- Natural apophyseal glides
