= Passive physiological intervertebral movements =

Spinal physical therapy assessment and treatment technique

- Specialty: Physical therapy
- [edit on Wikidata]

Passive physiological intervertebral movements (PPIVM) refers to a spinal physical therapy assessment and treatment technique developed by Geoff Maitland used to assess intervertebral movement at a single joint, and to mobilise neck stiffness.

== Technique ==
PPIVM is used as an assessment technique to assist with identifying the location, nature, severity and irritability of vertebral symptoms. They can be used to test for cervical or lumbar joint hypermobility or instability, or whether a joint is locked. PPIVM assessments test the movement available at a specific spinal level through the application of a passive physiological movement.

Cervical PPIVMs can be performed in cervical lateral flexion or rotation, with the therapist restricting movement beyond a certain cervical level by blocking with the hand; this allows the identification of the exact spinal level where patient symptoms occur. In regards to the lumbar spine, the technique is performed with the therapist reaching under the patient's knees, and lifting to obtain the desired lumbar movement whilst assessing the movement of the spinous process using the fingers.

== Clinical evidence ==
Although studies have suggested that the technique provides good intra-tester reliability, the reliability has also been reported to be poor.

== See also ==
- Passive accessory intervertebral movements
- Natural apophyseal glides
