= Dorn method =

The Dorn method is a form of manual, holistic alternative therapy used to correct misalignments in the spinal column and other joints. During a treatment, the practitioner palpates the patient's spine. If any 'unbalanced' areas are found, possible underlying misalignments are palpated with gentle pressure using the thumb or hand against the spinous processes, while the patient enacts guided movements such as swinging the leg or arms to distract the muscles' inertia; this is similar to the principle of mechanics known as 'counter pressure'. In case of pain, the patient is advised to stop the procedure in order to avoid any damage to the body.
