= Joint mobilization =

Type of passive movement of a skeletal joint

- Specialty: Physical therapy

Joint mobilization is a manual therapy intervention, a type of straight-lined, passive movement of a skeletal joint that addresses arthrokinematic joint motion (joint gliding) rather than osteokinematic joint motion. It is usually aimed at a 'target' synovial joint with the aim of achieving a therapeutic effect. These techniques are used by a variety of health care professionals with specific training in manual therapy assessment and treatment techniques.

The International Federation of Orthopaedic Manipulative Physical Therapists defines joint mobilization as "a manual therapy technique comprising a continuum of skilled passive movements that are applied at varying speeds and amplitudes to joints, muscles or nerves with the intent to restore optimal motion, function, and/or to reduce pain."

The APTA Guide to Physical Therapist Practice defines mobilization/manipulation as "a manual therapy technique comprised of a continuum of skilled passive movements that are applied at varying speeds and amplitudes, including a small amplitude/high velocity therapeutic movement."

== Classification and mechanisms ==
Joint mobilization is classified by the Australian physiotherapist Geoffrey Douglas Maitland into five 'grades' of motion, each of which describes the range of motion of the target joint during the procedure. They are generally divided into five grades. The different grades of manipulation are known to produce selective activation of different mechanoreceptors in the joint.

- Grade I – Low amplitude, rhythmically oscillating joint glide near the resting position of the available arthrokinematic joint play. Activates Type I mechanoreceptors that inhibit nociception and provide information regarding joint position. They have a low threshold and respond to a few grams of tension.

Activates mechanoreceptors in the superficial layer of the joint capsule – Bulbous corpuscles.

- Grade II – Relatively large amplitude, rhythmically oscillating joint glide that carries well into the available arthrokinematic joint play. Activates Type II mechanoreceptors that inhibit nociception and provide information about joint acceleration. They also have a low threshold and respond to a few grams of tension.

Activates mechanoreceptors in the deep layer of the joint capsule – Pacinian Corpuscles.

- Grade III – Relatively large amplitude, rhythmically oscillating joint glide that carries to the end of the available arthrokinematic joint play.

Designed to physically stretch the joint capsule.

- Grade IV – Low amplitude, rhythmically oscillating joint glide that is performed at the end of the available arthrokinematic joint play.

Designed to physically stretch the joint capsule.

- Grade V – This grade refers to the use of a single high-velocity, low-amplitude thrust performed at the end of the available joint play.

Activates Golgi tendon organ-like endings that inhibit muscle tone and monitor the direction of joint motion. They have a higher threshold and respond to forces on the order of kilograms – Golgi tendon organs.

== See also ==
- Natural apophyseal glides
- Orthopedic medicine
- Passive accessory intervertebral movements
- Passive physiological intervertebral movements
