= Decompression (surgery) =

Medical intervention

In medicine, decompression refers to the removal or repositioning of any structure compressing any other structure.

Common examples include decompressive craniectomy (removal of part of the skull to relieve pressure on the brain), a spinal decompression to relieve pressure on nerve roots, and a nerve decompression for peripheral nerve entrapments.
