= Functional spinal unit =

Smallest unit of the spine similar in mechanical mobility to the whole spine

A functional spinal unit (FSU), or motion segment, is the smallest physiological motion unit of the spine to exhibit biomechanical characteristics similar to those of the entire spine.

A FSU consists of two adjacent vertebrae, the intervertebral disc and all adjoining ligaments between them and excludes other connecting tissues such as muscles. The three-joint complex that results is sometimes referred to as the "articular triad".

In vitro studies of isolated or multiple FSU's are often used to measure biomechanical properties of the spine. The typical load-displacement behavior of a cadaveric FSU specimen is nonlinear. Within the total range of passive motion of any FSU, the typical load-displacement curve consists of 2 regions or 'zones' that exhibit very different biomechanical behavior. In the vicinity of the resting neutral position of the FSU, this load-displacement behavior is highly flexible. This is the region known as the 'neutral zone', which is the motion region of the joint where the passive osteoligamentous stability mechanisms exert little or no influence. During passive physiological movement of the FSU, motion occurs in this region against minimal internal resistance. It is a region in which a small load causes a relatively large displacement. The 'elastic zone' is the remaining region of FSU motion that continues from the end of the neutral zone to the point of maximum resistance (provided by the passive osteoligamentous stability mechanism), thus limiting the range of motion.
