= Neck manipulation =

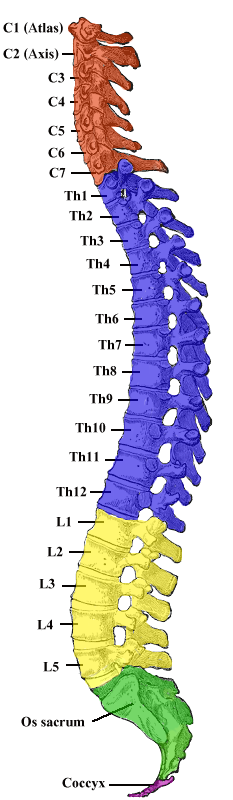
The vertebral column

Cervical manipulation, commonly known as neck manipulation, is a procedure involving adjustment of the upper seven vertebrae of the spinal column. This procedure is most often utilized by chiropractors, as well as osteopathic physicians who practice osteopathic manipulation. This type of manipulation may increase the risk of stroke and other issues, with studies suggesting the relationship is causative.

== Location ==
The cervical areas is located in the upper neck region of the spine from C1 to C7 .

== Methods ==
Many types of practitioners use various techniques to adjust the position of the cervical bones. They include bonesetters, physical therapists, chiropractors, non-physician osteopaths, and osteopathic physicians. The various techniques range from high velocity low amplitude thrusts to gentle positional release techniques such as Brett's Procedure.

== Risks ==
There are associated risks that come with cervical manipulation including spinal disc herniation, stroke and vertebral artery dissection. Chances of stroke may be increased due to possible tears in neck arteries, known as cervical dissection, and is among the most common causes of stroke for young and middle-aged adults. However, it is difficult to quantify this risk, with a 2012 meta analysis of previous studies stating that a significant risk "can not be ruled out", but noted that the true risk is possibly drastically underestimated, owing to the lack of a reporting requirement for private chiropractic practitioners.

== See also ==
- Chiropractor
- Spinal adjustment
