= Degeneration (medicine) =

Deterioration in the medical sense

Degeneration is deterioration in the medical sense. Generally, it is the change from a higher to a lower form. More specifically, it is the change of tissue to a lower or less functionally active form.

- True degeneration: when there is actual chemical change of the tissue itself.
- Infiltration: when the change consists of the deposit of abnormal matter in the tissues
- Degenerative disease

== See also ==
- Dysgenics
- Macular degeneration
- Neurodegenerative disease
- Social degeneration
