= Epidural abscess =

- Specialty: Neurology, Infectious disease, spine surgery
- Symptoms: Back pain, neck pain, fevers, weakness, loss of sensation, bowel or bladder incontinence, saddle anesthesia, paralysis
- Complications: Paralysis, death
- Risk factors: IV drug abuse, diabetes, alcoholism, cirrhosis, immunocompromize, chronic indwelling vascular catheter, recent spinal surgery, spinal fracture, end stage kidney disease or dialysis
- Diagnostic method: Magnetic resonance imaging (MRI) of the lumbar spine with gadolinium contrast, sampling of infectious material with culture and microbial testing
- Differential diagnosis: Vertebral osteomyelitis, discitis, meningitis, septic arthritis (of the intervertebral facet joints)
- Treatment: IV antibiotics, surgical drainage of the infection and possible spine decompression
- Frequency: Incidence 5.1-8.0 per 10,000

An epidural abscess is an infection in the epidural space (which is an anatomic space superficial to the dura mater which surrounds the spinal cord and the vertebra of the spine). A cranial epidural abscess is localized between the dura and the skull. Due to its location adjacent to the brain or spinal cord, epidural abscesses have the potential to cause weakness, pain, and paralysis. The classically described symptom triad of back pain, fever, and neurological symptoms in spinal epidural abscesses are present in a minority of patients at the time of diagnosis. Localized back pain is often the first symptom and is present in 80% of cases. Neurologic symptoms such as weakness, loss of sensation, bowel or bladder dysfunction (incontinence or urinary retention) are later findings and are associated with worsening disease as the infection presses on the spinal cord.

The preferred diagnostic test for a spinal epidural abscess is an magnetic resonance imaging (MRI) scan of the spine with gadolinium contrast. This is combined with sampling of the abscess for microbiological analysis (microbial culture, gram staining, and other testing) to determine the best antibiotic to use. Epidural abscesses are treated with intravenous antibiotics and surgery is usually done to debride and drain the infectious material. Delayed diagnosis and treatment (approximately more than 72 hours after the onset of neurologic deficits) are associated with worse outcomes (return to normal neurologic function) in spinal epidural abscess. Diagnosis is often delayed as the initial presenting symptoms (localized back pain) are non-specific. One-third of cases of spinal epidural abscess have diagnosis delayed longer than 2 weeks after symptom onset.

Spinal epidural abscess may be a complication of or present with other infections including vertebral osteomyelitis, discitis, septic arthritis of the intervertebral facet joints of the spine. Infection can also spread from local infections from outside the spine, such as a psoas abscess, decubitus ulcers, or retropharyngeal abscess to spread to the epidural space, causing an epidural spinal abscess. Infections may also spread from the bloodstream to the epidural space, but this is more rare.

== Types ==
=== Spinal epidural abscess ===
A spinal epidural abscess (SEA) is a collection of pus or infectious inflammatory granulation between the dura mater and the vertebral column. Currently the annual incidence rate of SEAs is estimated to be 5.1 to 8.0 cases per 10,000 hospital admissions. The incidence of SEA is increasing. This is believed to be due to factors such as an aging population, increase in use of invasive spinal instrumentation, growing number of patients with risk factors such as diabetes and intravenous drug use, and increased detection with more widespread use of MRI in medical imaging.

==== Signs and symptoms ====
Signs and symptoms of a spinal epidural abscess include localized back pain (seen in 80% of affected people), pain affecting the nerve root distribution areas of the body, weakness, loss of sensation, loss of bowel and bladder control, and paralysis (late in the disease course). The classic triad of spinal epidural abscess of fevers, localized back pain, and neurologic symptoms is only present in a minority of patients at the time of diagnosis (with less than 20% of people experiencing all three symptoms). Sepsis is present in 25-35% of people with spinal epidural abscess and fever is present in 24-62%. Due to the non-specific nature of early signs and symptoms (back pain), diagnosis may be delayed.

==== Pathophysiology ====
SEAs are more common in the ventral epidural space, and the most common location is the lumbar spine area, where epidural space is larger and contains more fat tissue. However, spinal epidural abscesses can be circumferential, completely surrounding the spine. SEAs also commonly affect multiple levels of the spine, and "skip lesions" in which segments of the spine are spared between infected segments does frequenty occur. Fifty percent of spinal epidural abscesses occur in the lumbar spine, 30-40% occur in the thoracic spine, and 10-20% occur in the cervical spine.

The most common bacteria that causes spinal epidural abscesses (responsibe for more than 50% of infections) is staph aureus (including methicillin-resistant Staphylococcus aureus (MRSA)). Other bacterial causes include coagulase-negative staphylococci, streptococcus, and enterococcus. The bacteria Serratia marcescens and the fungus candida are less common causes, but are more common in those with IV drug abuse. Enteric bacteria and gram negative bacilli such as E. coli are less common causes, but are more prone to infect the lumbar spine or sacrum.

==== Diagnosis ====
MRI of the spine with gadolinium contrast is the test of choice to diagnose spinal epidural abscesses. Computed tomograghy (CT) scans and positron emission tomography (PET) scans are secondary imaging tests used for diagnosis, but they are inferior to MRI. The infectious material in the epidural space should be sampled and sent for microbial analysis (gram stain, microbial culture, testing for organisms via polymerase chain reaction) to identify the infectious organism.

Inflammatory markers such as erythrocyte sedimentation rate (ESR) and C-reactive protein (CRP) are usually markedly elevated at the time of diagosis of ESA. And their levels can be serially checked during treatment as a marker of treatment response.

==== Treatment ====
Combined treatment of emergency surgery and antibiotics is the preferred treatment for the spinal epidural abscess, removing existing pus (which is tested for microorganisms to select the most appropriate antibiotic) and removing pressure from the spinal cord and nerve roots. Antibiotic therapy should start after obtaining infectious for microbiological investigation. In patients with neurologic defecits (weakness, loss of sensation, bowel or bladder dysfunction) urgent surgery is required and delayed surgery was associated with worse neurologic recovery. If there is another site of infection in addition to the spinal epidural abscess (such as a psoas abscess, infection in the retropharyngeal space, infected decubitus ulcer, infection in the posterior mediastinum) or spinal infections (discitis, osteomyelitis of the spine, septic arthritis of the intervertebral facet joints), these infections should also be treated. Ideally with debridement or drainage.

The choice of antibiotics in the treatment of spinal epidural abscess is not well established, and antibiotic choices are usually extrapolated from studies involving osteomyelitis of the spine. An empiric antibiotic regiment includes vancomycin plus ceftriaxone intravenously. In certain high risk individuals, such as those with IV drug abuse, spinal cord compression, neurologic defecits, sepsis, or a spinal epidural abscess as a result of a surgical site infection, experts recommend substituting ceftraxione with cefepime. Blood cultures and obtaining a sample of the infectious material (either surgically or via imaging guided needle draiange) for microbial analysis (including microbial culture) is used to select antibiotics that are most effective. A small subset of patients may be treated non-surgically with IV antibiotics and imaging guided needle drainage of the spinal epidural abscess. However, the people who are candidates for non-surgical treatment is not well understood. In those who are treated non-surgically, 28% will have progressive disease and eventually require surgery. Unless concomittant meningitis is present, the antibiotics do not have to cross the blood brain barrier. The duration of IV antibiotics in spinal epidural abscess is not well established and has been extrapolated from studies invovling osteomyelitis of the spine (which often involve concomittant spinal epidural abscesses). Generally, 6-8 weeks of intravenous antibiotics are used.

Neurologic function (with serial neurological examinations and patient subjective re-assessments) and pain levels should be monitored throghout the treatment period. It is unclear if serial MRI exams or obtaining an MRI of the spine at treatment completion improves outcomes.

==== Prognosis ====
In those treated for spinal epidural abscess, recurrent disease after treatment is rare. Three to six percent of people with spinal epidural abscess die during the hospitalization and 6-13% die within 90 days of hospitalization. A meta analysis found better neurologic recovery in those treated with surgery (86% neurologic recovery) vs. those treated non-operatively (69%). And in those with neurologic symptoms and spinal cord compression, early surgery within 72 hours of symptom onset is also associated with better neurologic recovery.

==== Epidemiology ====
Spinal epidural abscesses occur in all ages, but are more common in adults. The highest prevalence is between the fifth and seventh decades of life in males. Risk factors for SEAs include IV drug abuse, alcoholism, cirrhosis, diabetes, obesity, immunocompromise, chronic indwelling vascular catheters (such as central lines or dialysis catheters), a recent vertebral fracture, or recent spinal surgery. The incidence of SEAs have been increasing. The cause of the increased incidence is not completely understood, but is thought to be due to increased prevalence of IV drug abuse, increased use of spine surgery, or spinal instrumentation (spinal injections, spinal cord stimulators) and increased detection with more widespread use of MRI in medical imaging.

=== Cranial epidural abscess ===
A cranial epidural abscess involves pus and granulation tissue accumulation in between the dura mater and cranial bone. These typically arise (along with osteomyelitis of a cranial bone) from infections of the ear or paranasal sinuses. They rarely can be caused by distant infection or an infected cerebral venous sinus thrombosis. Staphylococcus aureus is the most common pathogen. Symptoms include pain at the forehead or ear, pus draining from the ear or sinuses, tenderness overlying the infectious site, fever, neck stiffness, and in rare cases focal seizures. Treatment requires a combination of antibiotics and surgical removal of infected bone.
