= Middle back pain =

- Other names: Upper back pain, thoracic back pain
- Specialty: Physical therapy

Middle back pain, also known as thoracic back pain, is back pain that is felt in the region of the thoracic vertebrae, which are between the bottom of the neck and top of the lumbar spine. It has a few potential causes, ranging from muscle strain to collapse of a vertebra or rare serious diseases. The upper spine is very strong and stable to support the weight of the upper body, as well as to anchor the rib cage which provides a cavity to allow the heart and lungs to function and protect them.

In most cases, the pain is likely to be self-limiting; in that case no diagnostic tests are required, and simple pain relief is sufficient. More severe and prolonged cases may require more specific pain management strategies and occasionally investigations for underlying medical diseases.

== Signs and symptoms ==
The thoracic spine begins at the base of the neck and extends to the middle of the trunk. Any pain in this area is considered "middle back pain".

The exact symptoms associated with middle back pain will depend upon the underlying cause. Most middle back pain is not serious in nature. However, it does tend to have more serious pathology associated with it than pain in the neck or low back. Symptoms can include pain, either locally near the spine or referred along area the corresponding nerve dermatome. Symptoms can also include numbness or pins and needles when nerve irritation or compression is involved. Weakness in the legs or loss of bowel or bladder control in the presence of thoracic spine pain can indicate spinal cord compression and should be investigated.

== Causes ==
The most common causes of upper back pain are unknown but theorized to originate from muscular irritation, intervertebral discs, spinal facet joints, ribs or soft tissue (e.g., ligament/fascia) problems. Commonly intra-scapular pain is referred from the lower cervical spine. Contributing factors to injury include; lack of strength, poor posture, overuse injuries (such as repetitive motion), or a trauma (such as a car accident or sports injury). Often thoracic pain can be aggravated twisting, side bending and with prolonged bent spinal postures.

A compression fracture of the vertebra can also cause acute and/or chronic pain in the upper back. Trauma may cause a fracture, but in women over age 50 without significant trauma or someone known to have osteoporosis, a spontaneous vertebral compression fracture is possible.

Other, less common causes of thoracic back pain include a spinal disc herniation which often may have radicular pain (wrapping around the ribs associated with numbness and burning pain), spinal tumors and rib fractures may mimic thoracic pain/radicular pain. Other possible sources of referral pain into the thoracic region include visceral organs like: lungs, gallbladder, stomach, liver duodenum, pleura and cardiac.

Middle back pain has long been considered a "red flag" to alert healthcare professionals to the possibility of cancer (metastasis or spread to the spine). This is not a sensitive or specific phenomenon and can therefore not be relied upon in isolation.

=== Risk factors ===
Thoracic spinal pain is associated with: concurrent musculoskeletal pain; growth and physical; lifestyle and social; backpack; postural; psychological; and environmental factors. Specific risk factors identified in adolescents included age (being older) and poorer mental health.

== Mechanism ==
The word "thoracic" means pertaining to the chest, and the thoracic spine comprises the upper portion of the spine that corresponds to the chest area. The upper spine includes twelve vertebrae, and each of the upper nine vertebrae in this section attach to a rib on either side of the spine. Each of the ribs then curves around the side of the body and attaches to the breastbone in front. This forms a sturdy structure (the thoracic cage) that supports and protects the internal organs — the heart, lungs and liver.

== Diagnosis ==
Detailed physiologic testing proving what percentage of pain in the thoracic spine is caused by disc, facet, rib or muscle are yet to be completed so the answer to the question what is causing the pain often is left unanswered.

If thoracic pain presents with weakness or numbness of the legs, bowel or bladder incontinence, and/or falling immediate MRI imaging is indicated.

== Management ==
Non specific thoracic spine pain is usually treated by one or a combination of the following:

- Exercise/Active and passive physical therapy
- Deep massage or massage therapy
- Ice and/or heat therapy
- Analgesics such as non-steroidal anti-inflammatory drugs
- Joint manipulation, as commonly performed by physical therapists, chiropractors or osteopathic physicians (D.O.).
- If there is a specific tender spot, then trigger point massage or injections can be helpful.

A painful vertebral compression fracture may be treated with pain medication and rest, or with vertebroplasty or kyphoplasty surgery. If the cause is thought to be osteoporosis, oral or intravenous bisphosphonates may be administered to reduce further fracture risk.

== See also ==
- Chronic pain
- Degenerative disc disease
- Low back pain
- Muscle strain
- Osteoporosis
- Spinal disc herniation
