= Psoas abscess =

Accumulation of pus in the iliopsoas muscle compartment within the hip

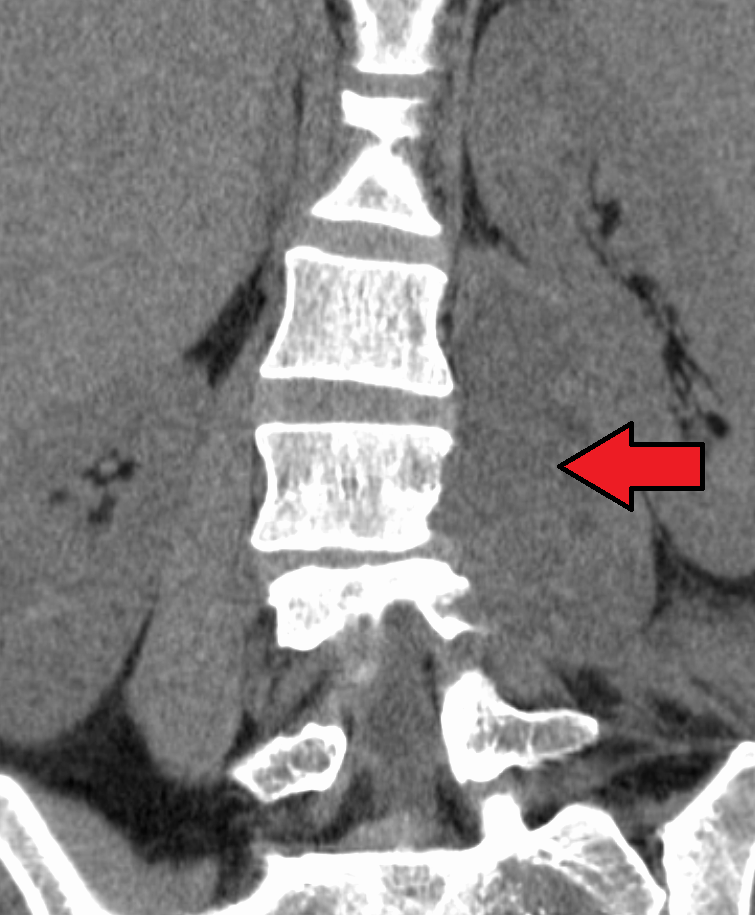
- Paraspinal abscess in the psoas muscle
- Specialty: Infectious diseases, surgery, gastroenterology

Psoas abscess is a collection of pus (abscess) in the iliopsoas muscle compartment. It can be classified into primary psoas abscess (caused by hematogenous or lymphatic spread of a pathogen) and secondary psoas abscess (resulting from contiguous spread from an adjacent infectious focus).

== Causes ==
Psoas abscess may be caused by lumbar tuberculosis, vertebral osteomyelitis, and pyelonephritis. Patients with Crohn's disease, diabetes, or immunocompromised states are at a higher risk of developing a psoas abscess.

== Symptoms ==
Symptoms include flank pain, fever, and an inguinal mass. A positive psoas sign should raise suspicion of psoas abscess as a possibility. Owing to the proximal attachments of the iliopsoas, such an abscess may drain inferiorly into the upper medial thigh and present as a swelling in the region. The sheath of the muscle arises from the lumbar vertebrae and the intervertebral discs between the vertebrae. The disc is more susceptible to infection, from tuberculosis and Salmonella discitis. The infection can spread into the psoas muscle sheath.

== Treatment ==
Treatment may involve drainage and antibiotics.

== Additional images ==
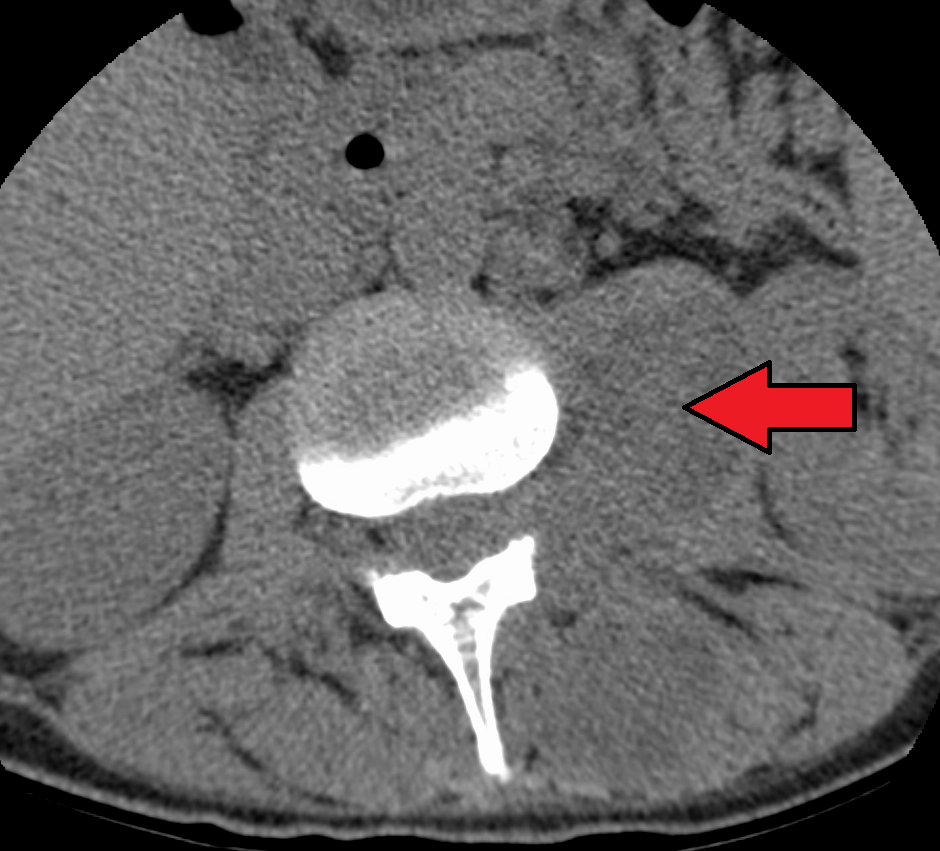
Paraspinal abscess in the psoas muscle

== See also ==
- Femoral hernia
- Transient synovitis
