= Toddler's fracture =

- Other names: Childhood accidental spiral tibial (CAST) fractures
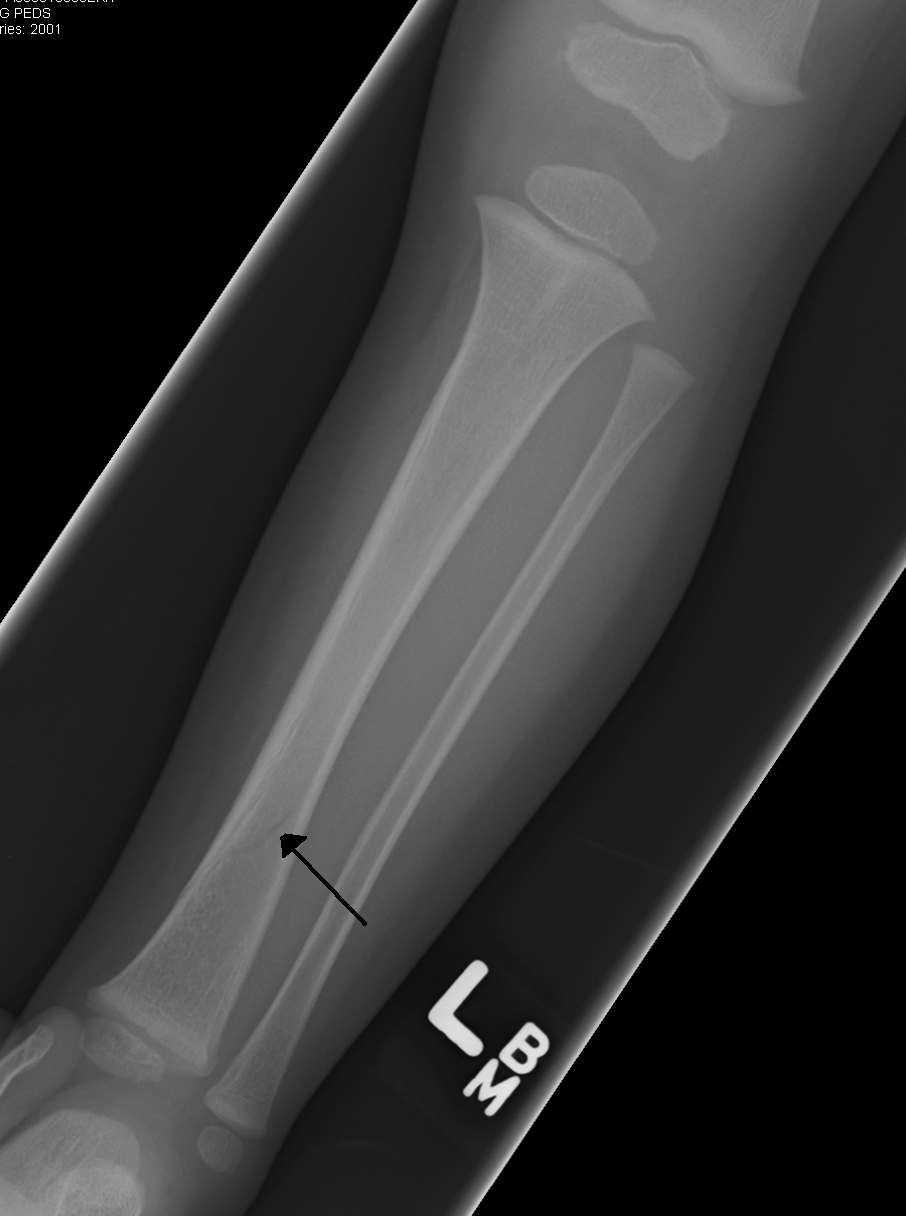
- A toddler's fracture
- Specialty: Orthopedic

Toddler's fractures are bone fractures of the distal (lower) part of the shin bone (tibia) in toddlers (aged 9 months-3 years) and other young children (less than 8 years). The fracture is found in the distal two thirds of the tibia in 95% of cases, is undisplaced and has a spiral pattern. It occurs after low-energy trauma, sometimes with a rotational component.

== Pathophysiology ==
The proposed mechanism involves shear stress and lack of displacement due to the periosteum that is relatively strong compared to the elastic bone in young children.

== Diagnosis ==
Typical symptoms include pain, refusing to walk or bear weight and limping -bruising and deformity are absent. On clinical examination, there can be warmth and swelling over the fracture area, as well as pain on bending the foot upwards (dorsiflexion). The initial radiographical images may be inconspicuous (a faint oblique line) and often even completely normal. After 1–2 weeks however, callus formation develops. The condition can be mistaken for osteomyelitis, transient synovitis or even child abuse. Contrary to CAST fractures, non-accidental injury typically affect the upper two-thirds or midshaft of the tibia.

Other possible fractures in this area, occurring in the cuboid, calcaneus, and fibula, can be associated or can be mistaken for a toddler's fracture. In some cases, an internal oblique radiography and radionuclide imaging can add information to anterior-posterior and lateral views. However, since treatment can also be initiated in the absence of abnormalities, this appears to have little value in most cases. It could be useful in special cases such as children with fever, those without a clear trauma or those in which the diagnosis remains unclear. Recently, ultrasound has been suggested as a helpful diagnostic tool.

== Treatment ==
Treatment consist of a long leg orthopedic cast for several weeks.

== History ==
The condition was initially recognised by Dunbar and co-workers in 1964. A new terminology has been proposed, which defines toddler's fracture as a subset of childhood accidental spiral tibial (CAST) fractures.
