= Spondylodiscitis =

- Specialty: Rheumatology

Spondylodiscitis is a combination of discitis (inflammation of one or more intervertebral disc spaces) and spondylitis (inflammation of one or more vertebrae), the latter generally involving the areas adjacent to the intervertebral disc space.

== Causes ==
Spondylodiscitis is the most common complication of sepsis or local infection, usually in the form of an abscess. A 14-year single-centre study from an Italian university hospital (2010–2023) observed an incidence of about 3 cases per 100,000 inhabitants per year. The main causative organisms are staphylococci, but potential organisms include a large number of bacteria, fungi, zoonoses. Spondylodiscitis frequently develops in immunocompromised individuals, such as by a cancer, infection, or by immunosuppressive drugs used for organ transplantations.

== Diagnosis ==
The main methods to diagnose a spondylodiscitis are magnetic resonance imaging (MRI), biopsy and microbiological tests such as PCR to determine an infectious cause. In the same study, positron emission tomography combined with computed tomography (PET/CT) was positive in 83% of the patients who underwent it, compared with 54% for labeled leukocyte scintigraphy.

== Treatment ==
Approximately 90% of cases can be treated conservatively. In the absence of spinal cord/nerve root compression and lack of data on instability of the inflamed segment, conservative treatment with:

- Antibiotics - empirical treatment should start AFTER biopsy material for microbiological testing is obtained. The following empirical treatment may be administered for a total of 6 weeks: Ceftriaxone 2x2g and Clindamycin 3x600mg i.v. for 2 weeks - Ciprofloxacin 2x500mg and Clindamycin 4x300mg p.o. for 4 more weeks If the pathogen can be identified - antibiotic treatment should be adapted to the susceptibilities of the microorganism.
- Bed rest
