= Transient synovitis =

Inflammation of the inner lining (synovium) of the hip joint capsule

- Other names: Transitory coxitis, Coxitis fugax, Acute transient epiphysitis, Coxitis serosa seu simplex, Phantom hip disease, Observation hip.
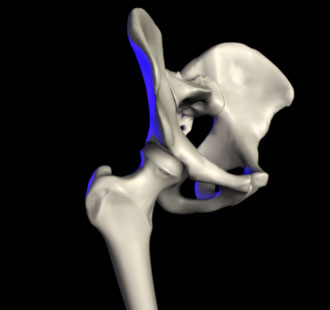
- The hip joint is formed between the femur and acetabulum of the pelvis.
- Specialty: Rheumatology

Transient synovitis of hip (also called toxic synovitis; see below for more synonyms) is a self-limiting condition in which there is an inflammation of the inner lining (the synovium) of the capsule of the hip joint. The term irritable hip refers to the syndrome of acute hip pain, joint stiffness, limp or non-weightbearing, indicative of an underlying condition such as transient synovitis or orthopedic infections (like septic arthritis or osteomyelitis). In everyday clinical practice however, irritable hip is commonly used as a synonym for transient synovitis. It should not be confused with sciatica, a condition describing hip and lower back pain much more common to adults than transient synovitis but with similar signs and symptoms.

Transient synovitis usually affects children between three and ten years old (but it has been reported in a 3-month-old infant and in some adults). It is the most common cause of sudden hip pain and limp in young children. Boys are affected two to four times as often as girls. The exact cause is unknown. A recent viral infection (most commonly an upper respiratory tract infection) or a trauma have been postulated as precipitating events, although these are reported only in 30% and 5% of cases, respectively.

Transient synovitis is a diagnosis of exclusion. The diagnosis can be made in the typical setting of pain or limp in a young child who is not generally unwell and has no recent trauma. There is a limited range of motion of the hip joint. Nevertheless, children with transient synovitis of the hip can usually weight bear. This is an important clinical differentiating sign from septic arthritis. Blood tests may show mild inflammation. An ultrasound scan of the hip joint can show a fluid collection (effusion). Treatment is with nonsteroidal anti-inflammatory drugs and limited weight-bearing. The condition usually clears by itself within seven to ten days, but a small group of patients will continue to have symptoms for several weeks. The recurrence rate is 4–17%, most of which is in the first six months.

== Symptoms and signs ==
Transient synovitis causes pain in the hip, thigh, groin or knee on the affected side. However, children with transient synovitis of the hip can usually weight bear with varying degrees of limping. There may be a limp (or abnormal crawling in infants) with or without pain. In small infants, the presenting complaint can be unexplained crying (for example, when changing a diaper). The condition is nearly always limited to one side. The pain and limp can range from mild to severe.

Some children may have a slightly raised temperature; high fever and general malaise point to other, more serious conditions. On clinical examination, the child typically holds the hip slightly bent, turned outwards and away from the middle line (flexion, external rotation and abduction). Active and passive movements may be limited because of pain, especially abduction and internal rotation. The hip can be tender to palpation. The log roll test involves gently rotating the entire lower limb inwards and outwards with the patient on his back, to check when muscle guarding occurs. The unaffected hip and the knees, ankles, feet and spine are found to be normal.

=== Complications ===
In the past, there have been speculations about possible complications after transient synovitis. The current consensus however is that there is no proof of an increased risk of complications after transient synovitis.

One such previously suspected complication was coxa magna, which is an overgrowth of the femoral head and broadening of the femoral neck, accompanied by changes in the acetabulum, which may lead to subluxation of the femur. There was also some controversy about whether continuous high intra-articular pressure in transient synovitis could cause avascular necrosis of the femoral head (Legg-Calvé-Perthes disease), but further studies did not confirm any link between the two conditions.

== Diagnosis ==
There are no set standards for the diagnosis of suspected transient synovitis, so the amount of investigations will depend on the need to exclude other, more serious diseases. It is of great importance to exclude the diagnosis of septic arthritis. This is because if septic arthritis is missed in children, grave complications can occur. The exclusion of septic arthritis is mainly built upon the physician's clinical expertise and is supplemented by basic laboratory test and relevant imaging modalities. Additionally, beware to exclude the diagnosis of acute osteomyelitis, because it not uncommonly cooccurs with septic arthritis of the hip in children.

Inflammatory parameters in the blood may be slightly raised (these include erythrocyte sedimentation rate, C-reactive protein and white blood cell count), but raised inflammatory markers are strong predictors of other more serious conditions such as septic arthritis.

X-ray imaging of the hip is most often unremarkable. Subtle radiographic signs include an accentuated pericapsular shadow, widening of the medial joint space, lateral displacement of the femoral epiphyses with surface flattening (Waldenström sign), prominent obturator shadow, diminution of soft tissue planes around the hip joint or slight demineralisation of the proximal femur. The main reason for radiographic examination is to exclude bony lesions such as occult fractures, slipped upper femoral epiphysis or bone tumours (such as osteoid osteoma). An anteroposterior and frog lateral (Lauenstein) view of the pelvis and both hips is advisable.

An ultrasound scan of the hip can easily demonstrate fluid inside the joint capsule (Fabella sign), although this is not always present in transient synovitis. However, it cannot reliably distinguish between septic arthritis and transient synovitis. If septic arthritis needs to be ruled out, needle aspiration of the fluid can be performed under ultrasound guidance. In transient synovitis, the joint fluid will be clear. In septic arthritis, there will be pus in the joint, which can be sent for bacterial culture and antibiotic sensitivity testing.

More advanced imaging techniques can be used if the clinical picture is unclear; the exact role of different imaging modalities remains uncertain. Some studies have demonstrated findings on magnetic resonance imaging (MRI scan) that can differentiate between septic arthritis and transient synovitis (for example, signal intensity of adjacent bone marrow). Skeletal scintigraphy can be entirely normal in transient synovitis, and scintigraphic findings do not distinguish transient synovitis from other joint conditions in children. CT scanning does not appear helpful.

=== Differential diagnosis ===
Pain in or around the hip and/or limp in children can be due to a large number of conditions. Septic arthritis (a bacterial infection of the joint) is the most important differential diagnosis, because it can quickly cause irreversible damage to the hip joint. Fever, raised inflammatory markers on blood tests and severe symptoms (inability to bear weight, pronounced muscle guarding) all point to septic arthritis, but a high index of suspicion remains necessary even if these are not present. Osteomyelitis (infection of the bone tissue) can also cause pain and limp.

Bone fractures, such as a toddler's fracture (spiral fracture of the shin bone), can also cause pain and limp, but are uncommon around the hip joint. Soft tissue injuries can be evident when bruises are present. Muscle or ligament injuries can be contracted during heavy physical activity —however, it is important not to miss a slipped upper femoral epiphysis. Avascular necrosis of the femoral head (Legg-Calvé-Perthes disease) typically occurs in children aged 4–8, and is also more common in boys. There may be an effusion on ultrasound, similar to transient synovitis.

Neurological conditions can also present with a limp. If developmental dysplasia of the hip is missed early in life, it can come to attention later in this way. Pain in the groin can also be caused by diseases of the organs in the abdomen (such as a psoas abscess) or by testicular disease. Rarely, there is an underlying rheumatic condition (juvenile idiopathic arthritis, Lyme arthritis, gonococcal arthritis, ...) or bone tumour.

== Treatment ==
Treatment consists of rest, non-weightbearing and painkillers when needed. A small study showed that the nonsteroidal anti-inflammatory drug ibuprofen could shorten the disease course (from 4.5 to 2 days) and provide pain control with minimal side effects (mainly gastrointestinal disturbances). If fever occurs or the symptoms persist, other diagnoses need to be considered.
