= Saddle anesthesia =

Saddle Anesthesia
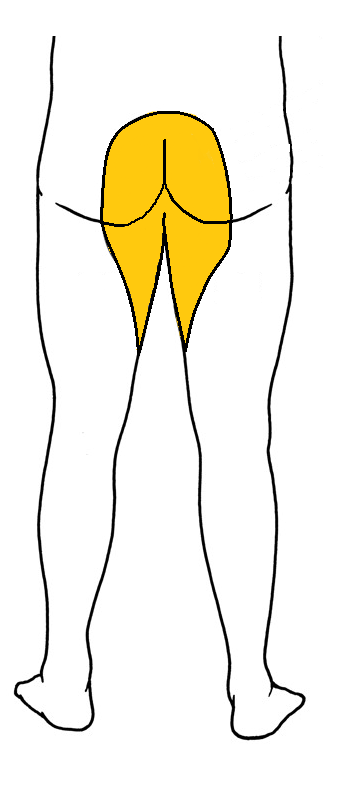
- Approximate area of "saddle anesthesia" seen from behind (yellow highlight)
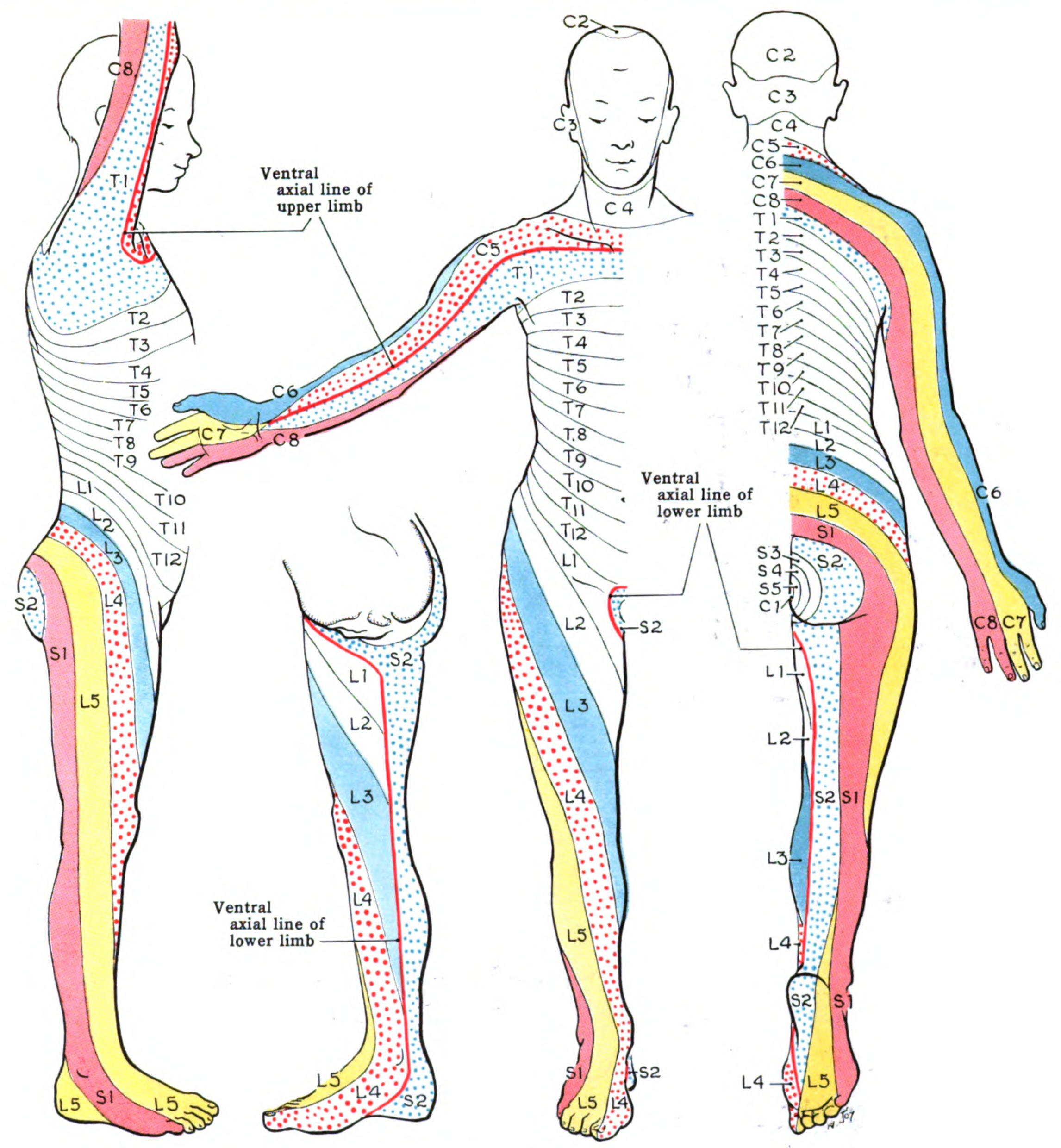
- Dermatome distribution
- Differential diagnosis: cauda equina syndrome

Saddle anesthesia is a loss of sensation (anesthesia) restricted to the area of the buttocks, perineum, genitals, and inner surfaces of the thighs. The affected distribution corresponds to S2-S5 root dermatomes. These are areas that comes into contact with a horse saddle, hence the term “saddle anesthesia”. Saddle anesthesia is considered a medical emergency and requires prompt evaluation including patient history, physical exam and imaging.

== Causes and Pathophysiology ==
Saddle anesthesia is often viewed as part of a collection of acute symptoms associated with spine-related injury, most commonly cauda equina syndrome or conus medullaris syndrome. The most common cause of cauda equina syndrome or conus medullaris syndrome is a large lumbar disc herniation, while less common causes are spinal stenosis, epidural hematoma, epidural abscess, direct trauma, postoperative complications (eg., placement of interspinous device), primary or metastatic neoplasms, and chiropractic manipulation. Saddle anesthesia may also occur as a complication of spinal anesthesia or a sacral extradural injection. These conditions can compress or affect the lumbosacral nerve roots, leading to varied clinical presentation, including back pain, sciatica, bladder dysfunction, bowel dysfunction, sexual dysfunction, sensory or motor deficits, and saddle anestheisa. When the S2-S5 nerve roots are specifically affected, numbness around buttocks, perineum, genitals, and inner surfaces of the thighs can be observed. This pattern of sensory loss is termed as saddle anesthesia.

== Clinical presentation ==
Saddle anesthesia is considered a medical emergency as it may indicate a serious spinal injury. It should be evaluated promptly with patient history, physical exam, and imaging.

Saddle anesthesia may be accompanied by other symptoms including back pain, sciatica (unilateral or bilateral), bladder dysfunction (incontinence or retention), bowel dysfunction (incontinence or constipation), sensory abnormalities (bilateral or unilateral), and sexual dysfunction. Saddle anesthesia can present as unilateral or bilateral anesthesia. Asymmetric saddle anesthesia is frequently associated with cauda equina syndrome, while symmetric saddle anesthesia is associated with conus medullaris syndrome.

The patient history should be evaluated for any traumatic, ischemic, infectious, or metastatic etiology, as well as recent procedural history. Discerning an acute or chronic presentation of symptoms may assist in assessing the cause of saddle anesthesia.

== Evaluation ==
Physical examination may reveal decreased perineal, perianal, or urinary sensation, decreased anal tone, neurological deficits including changes to lower limb reflexes, strength, and sensation. MRI is the preferred choice as it allows better visualization of the spinal cord, nerve roots, and tissues around the nerve roots.

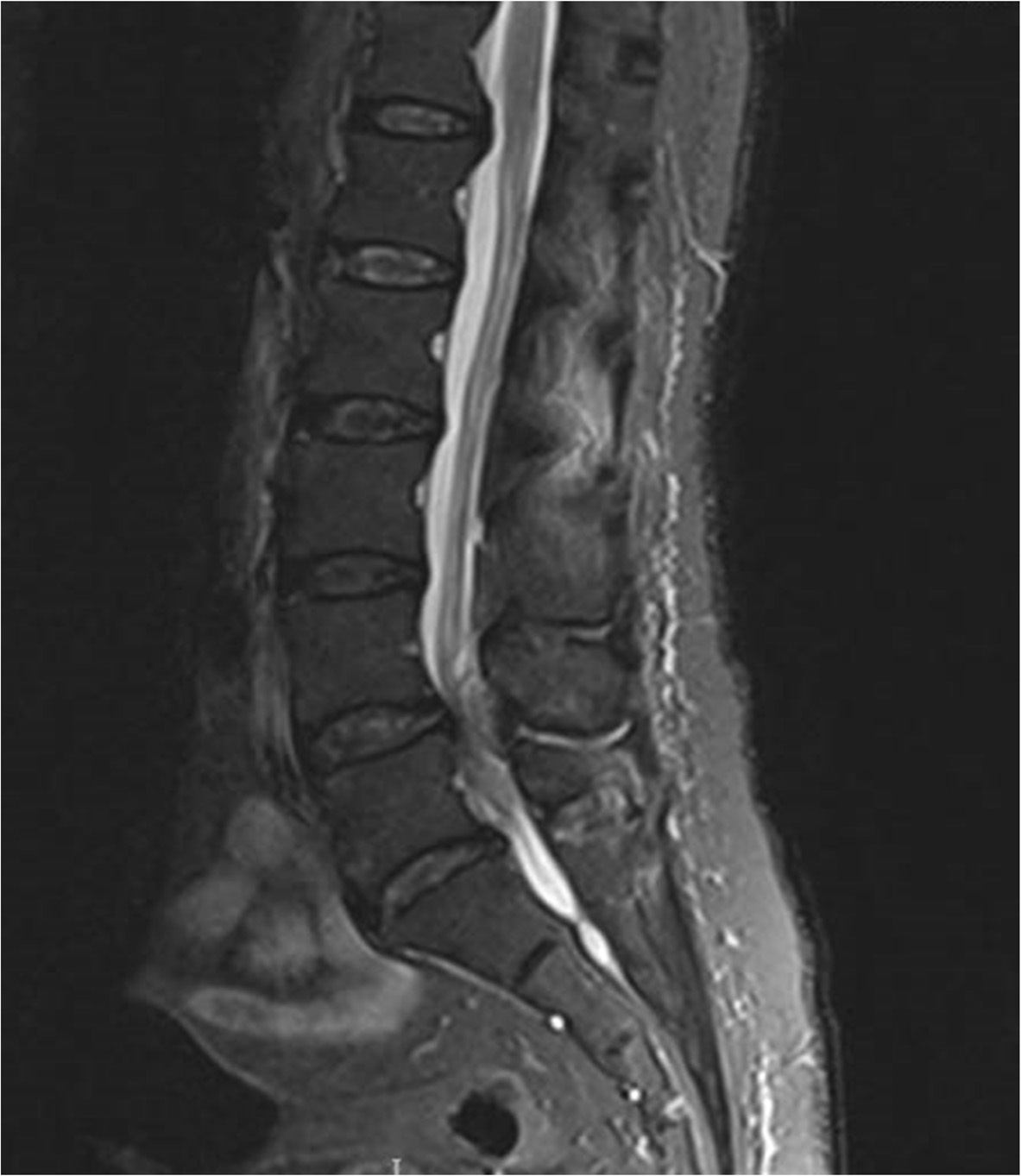
An MRI of the lumbar spine showing an abscess in the posterior epidural space, causing cauda equina syndrome

== Management ==
Depending on the etiology, a multidisciplinary team (neurosurgery, orthopedic surgery, oncology, or infectious disease specialists) may be warranted and treatment could include prompt surgical decompression or conservative management.

== Prognosis and complications ==
Delay in treatment can lead to long term consequences including sensory abnormalities, paralysis, sexual dysfunction, bladder and bowel dysfunction. Due to the long term consequences for patient, it carries a medicolegal risk for medical providers and institutions for litigation.

== See also ==
- Cauda equina syndrome
- Conus medullaris syndrome
- Dermatome
- Pudendal anesthesia ("Saddle block")
- Radiculopathy
- Septic shock
- Spinal stenosis
- Urinary retention
