= Limp =

Type of asymmetric abnormality of the gait

- Limping
- Specialty: Neurology, pediatrics, orthopedics

A limp is a type of asymmetric abnormality of the gait. Limping may be caused by pain, weakness, neuromuscular imbalance, or a skeletal deformity. The most common underlying cause of a painful limp is physical trauma; however, in the absence of trauma, other serious causes, such as septic arthritis or slipped capital femoral epiphysis, may be present. The diagnostic approach involves ruling out potentially serious causes via the use of X-rays, blood tests, and sometimes joint aspiration. Initial treatment involves pain management. A limp is the presenting problem in about 4% of children who visit hospital emergency departments.

== Definition ==
A limp is a type of asymmetric abnormality of the gait. When due to pain it is referred to as an antalgic gait, in which the foot is in contact with the ground for a shorter duration than usual; in severe cases there may be a refusal to walk. Hip deformities with associated muscular weakness, on the other hand, may be present with a Trendelenburg gait, with the body shifted over the affected hip.

== Differential diagnosis ==
The causes of limping are many and can be either serious or non-serious. It usually results from pain, weakness, neuromuscular imbalance, or a skeletal deformity. In 30% of cases, the underlying cause remains unknown after appropriate investigations. The most common underlying cause of limping in children is minor physical trauma. In those with no history of trauma, 40% are due to transient synovitis and 2% are from Legg–Calvé–Perthes syndrome. Other important causes are infectious arthritis, osteomyelitis, and slipped capital femoral epiphysis in children.

=== Infection ===
==== Septic arthritis ====
Septic arthritis can be difficult to separate from less serious conditions such as transient synovitis. Factors that can help indicate septic arthritis rather than synovitis include a WBC count greater than 12×10^{9}/l, fever greater than 38.5 °C (101.3 °F), ESR greater than 40 mm/h, CRP greater than 2.0 mg/dL, and refusal to walk. People with septic arthritis usually look clinically toxic or sick. Even in the absence of any of these factors, however, septic arthritis may be present. Joint aspiration is required to confirm the diagnosis.

==== Other ====
Other infections that classically lead to a limp include Lyme disease (a bacterial infection spread by deer ticks) and osteomyelitis (an infection of the bone).

=== Mechanical ===
==== Trauma ====
Physical trauma may result in either a fracture, muscle bruising, or a contusion. It is the leading cause of a limp.

==== Slipped capital femoral epiphysis ====
Slipped capital femoral epiphysis (SCFE) is a condition in which the growth plate of the head of the femur slips over the underlying bone. It most commonly presents with hip pain in males during puberty and is associated with obesity. The majority of people affected have a painful limp and in half of cases both hips are affected. Nearly a quarter of people present with only knee pain. Treatment involves non-weight-bearing movement and surgery. If not identified early, osteonecrosis or death of the head of the femur may occur.

==== Other ====
A non-painful limp may be due to a number of mechanical conditions including hip dysplasia and leg length differences.

=== Inflammatory ===
==== Transient synovitis ====
Transient synovitis is a reactive arthritis of the hip of unknown cause. People are usually able to walk and may have a low grade fever. They usually look clinically nontoxic or otherwise healthy. It may only be diagnosed once all other potential serious causes are excluded. With symptomatic care it usually resolves over one week.

==== Juvenile rheumatoid arthritis ====
Juvenile rheumatoid arthritis presents gradually with early morning stiffness, fatigue, and weight loss.

=== Vascular ===
==== Legg–Calvé–Perthes syndrome ====
Legg–Calvé–Perthes syndrome is a degenerative disease of the head of the femur which results in bone loss and deformity. It usually presents as a chronic condition.

=== Neoplastic ===
Cancers including acute lymphocytic leukemia, osteosarcoma, and Ewing’s sarcoma may result in a gradual onset of limping in children. It is often associated with night sweating, easy bruising, weight loss, and pain most prominent at night.

== Diagnostic approach ==
The diagnosis of the cause of a limp is often made based on history, physical exam findings, laboratory tests, and radiological examination. If a limp is associated with pain it should be urgently investigated, while non-painful limps can be approached and investigated more gradually. Young children have difficulty determining the location of leg pain, thus in this population, knee pain equals hip pain. SCFE can usually be excluded by an x-ray of the hips. An ultrasound or x-ray guided aspiration of the hip joint maybe required to rule out an infectious process within the hip.

== Epidemiology ==
A limp at one hospital emergency department was the presenting complaint in 4% of children. It occurs twice as commonly in boys as in girls.
