= Discitis =

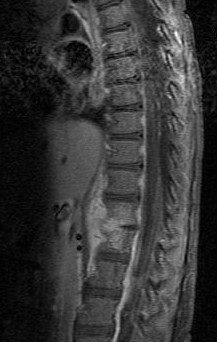
- Discitis in a 2 year old child.
- Specialty: Rheumatology

Discitis, or diskitis, is an infection in the intervertebral disc space that affects different age groups. Symptoms include severe back pain, leading to lack of mobility. In adults, it can lead to severe consequences, such as sepsis or epidural abscess, but it can also spontaneously resolve, especially in children under 8 years of age. Discitis occurs post-surgically in approximately 1–2 percent of patients after spinal surgery. There is debate as to the cause. Diagnosis is usually apparent on MRI, although plain X-rays and CT examinations can be suggestive. Treatment is difficult and usually includes antibiotics. Reducing the mobility of the affected region is an occasionally recommended solution, but changes from case to case.

== Description ==
Discitis is an infection in the intervertebral disc space. It affects different age groups.

== Signs and symptoms ==
Symptoms include severe back pain, leading to lack of mobility. In adults, it can lead to severe consequences, such as sepsis or epidural abscess, but it can also spontaneously resolve, especially in children under 8 years of age. Discitis occurs post-surgically in approximately 1–2 percent of patients after spinal surgery. Some very young children may refuse to walk and arching of the back is possible. In post-operative situations, the symptoms occur within a week and result in severe low back pain or neck pain (depending on the surgical location).

If untreated, the discitis may resolve on its own, causing spontaneous fusion of the intervertebral disc space, cause a chronic low grade infection, or progress to osteomyelitis and possibly even an epidural abscess. In case of concomitant inflammation of one or more vertebrae (in such cases usually involving the areas adjacent to the intervertebral disc spaces) the condition is called spondylodiscitis.

== Epidemiology ==
According to a 2008 study, the incidence of discitis in the United States is around 0.4 to 2.4 per 100,000 people each year depending on age group. According to a later 2016 study, the combined prevalence of discitis and vertebral osteomyelitis with or without spinal epidural abscess for persons under 20 years old is uncommon (0.3 per 100,000 persons), and higher in older patients (6.5 per 100,000 persons over 70 years old).

== Causes ==
There is debate as to the cause, although hematogenous seeding of the offending organism is favored as well as direct spread. Spontaneous discitis is usually from hematologic spread from a urinary or respiratory infection while discitis from a post-operative complication usually involves skin flora such as staph aureus. It can be caused due to spinal tuberculosis and spread along spinal ligament to involve the adjacent anterior vertebral bodies, causing angulation of the vertebrae with subsequent kyphosis. The cause may be aseptic.

== Diagnosis ==
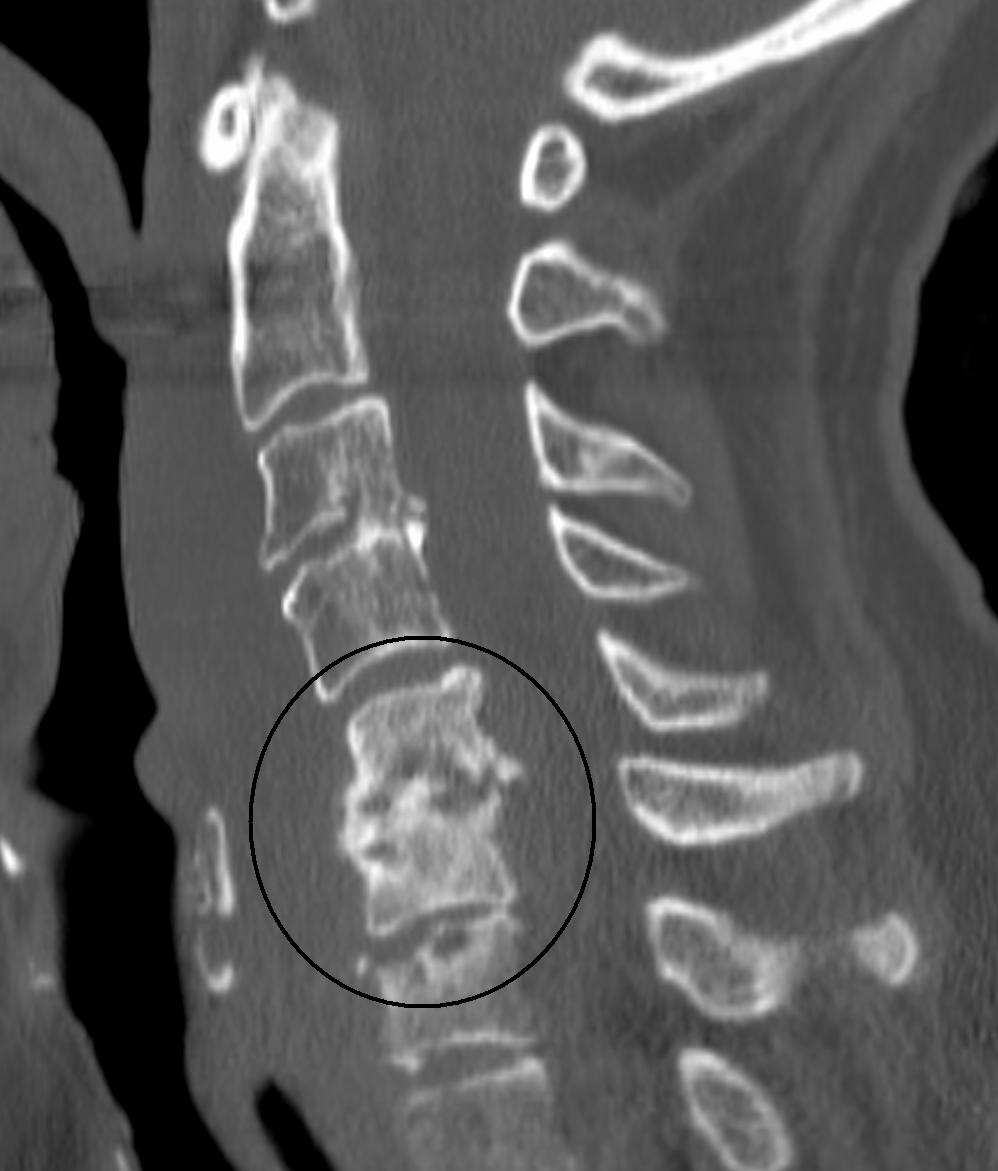
An infected disc at the level of C5 C6 causing neurological symptoms

Diagnosis is usually apparent on MRI, although plain X-rays and CT examinations can be suggestive. The MRI will reveal air changes in the disc and possibly even external involvement involving the bone or epidural regions. A biopsy may be performed and helps with diagnosis in some cases but often an organism is not obtained. C-reactive protein levels and ESR levels will be elevated and are useful for treatment. The white blood cell count may be normal.

Differential diagnosis includes other common causes of back pain and the potential for rarer infections, noting that some differential diagnoses like epidural abscesses and osteomyelitis may be caused by discitis or have a separate cause. This includes:

- Osteomyelitis
- Spinal tumors
- Spinal epidural abscess
- Spinal fracture
- Muscle or tendon injury
- Spinal disc herniation
- Inflammatory spondyloarthropathies

== Treatment ==
Treatment usually includes antibiotics, and reducing the mobility of the affected region, either with a back brace or a plaster cast. Without treatment, the patient may form an abscess which may need to be surgically corrected. Due to the poor vascularity of the disc, drugs required for treatment often include potent agents such as Ciprofloxacin along with Vancomycin. Occasionally, oral drugs can be used to treat the infection but it may fail and IV drugs may be required.

If the patient is an adult, many surgeons and doctors now recommend moving little and often and within the pain limits of the medication. Discs respond to osmotic pressure therefore movement is beneficial to increase their blood flow and fluid dynamics. In children, whether to bed rest or move a little is decided on an individual basis, depending on the site and severity of the discitis.
