= Vertebral osteomyelitis =

- Other names: Spinal osteomyelitis, Spondylodiskitis, or Disk-space infection,
- Specialty: Infectious disease, orthopedics

Vertebral osteomyelitis is a type of osteomyelitis (infection and inflammation of the bone and bone marrow) that affects the vertebrae. It is a rare bone infection concentrated in the vertebral column. Cases of vertebral osteomyelitis are so rare that they constitute only 2%-4% of all bone infections. The infection can be classified as acute or chronic depending on the severity of the onset of the case, where acute patients often experience better outcomes than those living with the chronic symptoms that are characteristic of the disease. Although vertebral osteomyelitis is found in patients across a wide range of ages, the infection is commonly reported in young children and older adults. Vertebral osteomyelitis often attacks two vertebrae and the corresponding intervertebral disk, causing narrowing of the disc space between the vertebrae. The prognosis for the disease is dependent on where the infection is concentrated in the spine, the time between initial onset and treatment, and what approach is used to treat the disease.

== Signs and symptoms ==
The disease is known for its subtle onset in patients, and few symptoms characterize vertebral osteomyelitis. Correct diagnosis of the disease is often delayed for an average of six to twelve weeks due to such vague, ambiguous symptoms.

=== General Cases ===
General symptoms found in a cross-section of patients with vertebral osteomyelitis include fever, swelling at the infection site, weakness of the vertebral column and surrounding muscles, episodes of night sweats, and difficulty transitioning from a standing to a sitting position. Additionally, persistent back pain and muscle spasms may become so debilitating that they confine the patient to a sedentary state, where even slight movement or jolting of the body results in excruciating pain. In children, the presence of vertebral osteomyelitis can be signaled by these symptoms, along with high-grade fevers and an increase in the body's leukocyte count.

=== Advanced Cases ===
Patients with an advanced case may present some or none of the symptoms associated with general cases of vertebral osteomyelitis. When the osteomyelitis is isolated in the back, as it is in vertebral osteomyelitis, the patient will report muscle spasms coming from the back, but may not report experiencing any fevers. Symptomatic signs vary in each patient and depend on the severity of the case. Neurologic deficiency characterizes advanced, threatening cases of the disease. On average, 40% of patients with an advanced case of vertebral osteomyelitis experience some type of neurological deficiency; this is a sign that the infection has been progressing for some time. In advanced cases, the untreated infection will attack the nervous system through the spinal cord which runs parallel to the vertebral column, placing the patient at risk for paralysis of the extremities. Additionally, loss of the ability to move is a trademark symptom of neurologic problems in advanced cases of vertebral osteomyelitis. Any further signs of neurological deficit signal an advanced case of vertebral osteomyelitis that requires immediate intervention to prevent further threat to the spinal cord.

== Causes ==
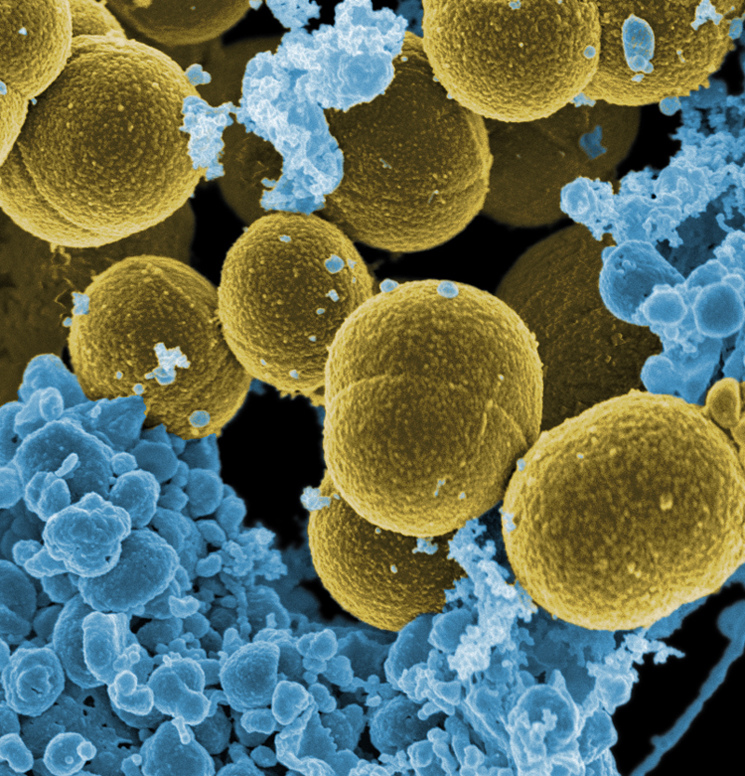
Staphylococcus aureus, the most common microorganism associated with vertebral osteomyelitis

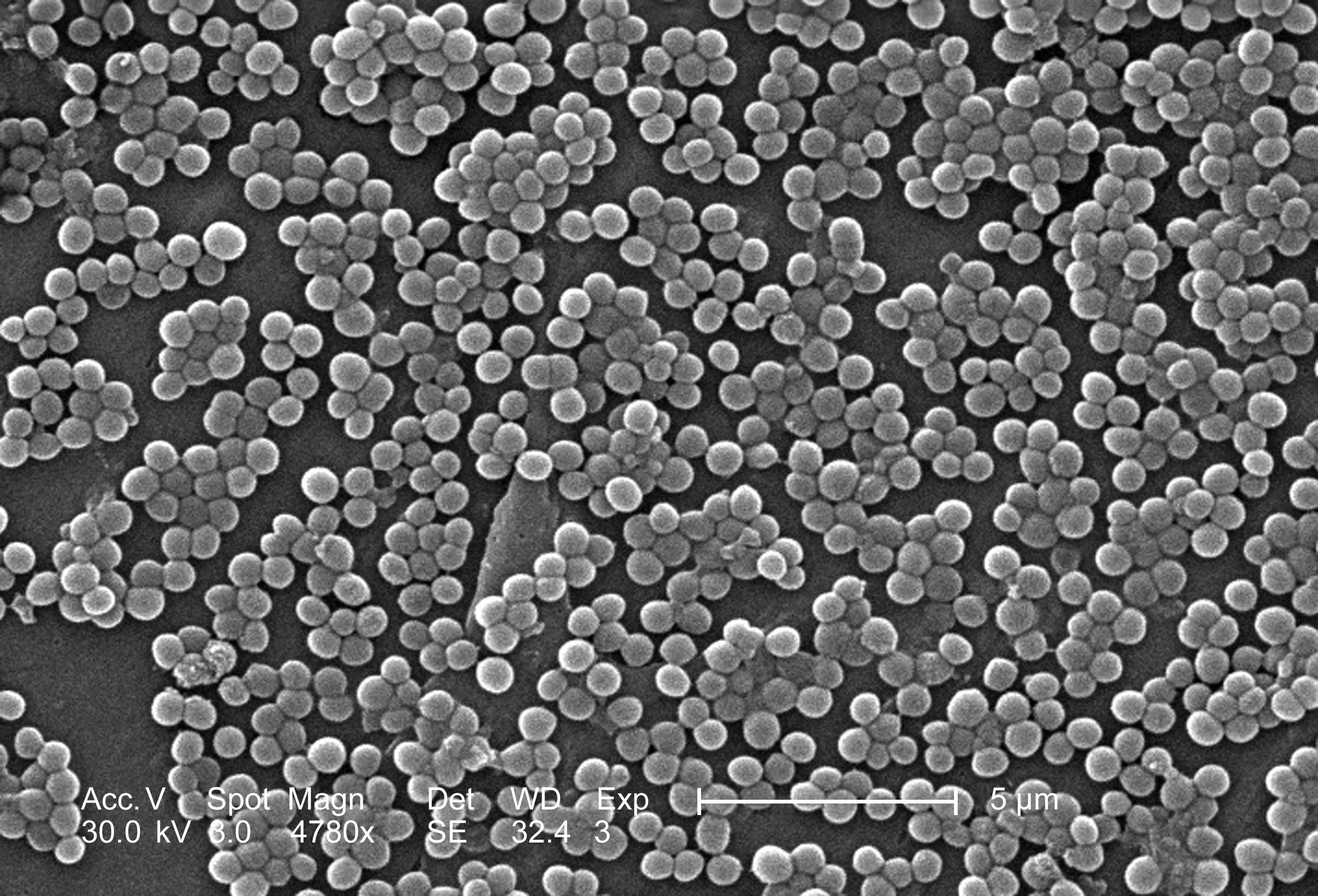
MRSA, a rare pathogen associated with some cases of vertebral osteomyelitis

A notable aspect of the disease is found in its ability to start anywhere in the body and spread to other regions through the bloodstream. A number of bacterial strains can enter the body in this manner, making the origin of the infection hard to trace; thus, for many patients with the infection, this characteristic can delay an accurate diagnosis and prolong suffering. The most common microorganism associated with vertebral osteomyelitis is the bacteria staphylococcus aureus. Another strain of staphylococcus aureus, commonly known as Methicillin-resistant Staphylococcus aureus (MRSA), is a particularly harmful microorganism that is more difficult to treat than other related strains. Streptococcus equisimilis may also be responsible for the onset of vertebral osteomyelitis, though it is thought to be less virulent than staphylococcus aureus. Recently, healthcare associated vertebral osteomyelitis (HAVO) has been reported to make a relevant share of all VO cases and to lead to higher rates of mortality and recurrence of infection compared to community acquired vertebral osteomyelitis (CAVO). Particularly in the context of medical interventions (HAVO), low-virulent coagulase-negative staphylococci are playing an increasing role, bringing with them the problem of methicillin resistance.

== Diagnosis ==
Diagnosis of vertebral osteomyelitis is often complicated due to the delay between the onset of the disease and the initial display of symptoms. Before pursuing radiological methods of testing, physicians often order a full blood test to see how the patient's levels compare to normal blood levels in a healthy body. In a complete blood test, the C-reactive protein (CRP) is an indicator of infection levels, the complete blood count (CBC) evaluates the presence of white and red blood cells, and the erythrocyte sedimentation rate (ESR) tests for inflammation in the body. Anomalous values that lie outside the acceptable ranges in any of these subcategories confirm the presence of infection in the body and indicate that further diagnostic measures are necessary. Blood tests may prove inconclusive and may not serve as enough evidence to confirm the presence of vertebral osteomyelitis. Diagnosis can also be complicated due to the disease's similarity to discitis, commonly known as an infection of the disc space. Both diseases are characterized by a patient's inability to walk and concentrated back pain; however, patients with vertebral osteomyelitis often appear more ill than those with discitis. Additional measures may be called upon to rule out the possibility of discitis; such approaches include diagnosing the disease through various medical imaging techniques.

=== Radiological Diagnosis ===
Radiological intervention is often necessary to confirm the presence of vertebral osteomyelitis in the body. Plain-film radiological orders are necessary for all patients displaying symptoms of the disease. This diagnostic approach is often preliminary to other radiological procedures, such as magnetic resonance imaging, or MRI, computed tomography (CT) scan, fine-needle aspiration biopsy, and nuclear scintigraphy. The initial plain-film X-ray images are scanned for any indication of disc compression between two vertebrae or the degeneration of one or more vertebrae. Only when these findings are ambiguous is further testing necessary to diagnose the disease. Other radiological approaches offer more comprehensive imaging of the spinal area, but can often prove inconclusive. MRI scans do not expose the patient to radiation and are highly sensitive to changes in the size and appearance of the intervertebral discs; however, findings on the MRI scan may be confused with other conditions such as the presence of tumors or bone fractures. If MRI imaging is inconclusive, the high sensitivity to erosions in the vertebrae or intervertebral discs of CT scans may be preferred for their ability to indicate signs of the disease more clearly than MRI. Additional tests may be ordered if such preliminary tests cannot confirm a diagnosis; for example, needle biopsies may be needed to take samples of bone surrounding the disc space where the infection is thought to live, or nuclear bone scans may be used to contrast areas of healthy bone with areas of infection.

== Treatment ==
Treatment options for vertebral osteomyelitis depend on the severity of the infection. Since the use of intravenous antibiotics seems to eliminate the responsible pathogen in most cases of vertebral osteomyelitis, physicians often attempt nonsurgical intervention before considering surgical options of treatment.

=== Nonsurgical intervention ===
Nonsurgical intervention is often desired because it possesses less risk to the body of further infection that can occur if the body is unnecessarily exposed to other outside pathogens during surgery. Intravaneous antibiotics may be prescribed to kill the microorganism causing the infection. Such antibiotics are administered at a continuous rate for a varying amount of time, lasting from four weeks to several months. The outcome for patients who undergo intravaneous infusion differs according to factors such as age, strength of the immune system, and erythrocyte sedimentation rate (ESR). If intervention through antibiotics fails, patients are directed toward surgical treatment options. Further, Absolute indications for surgical treatment must include sepsis, epidural abscess, neurologic deficits/complications, and instability/deformity in the affected motion segment.

=== Surgical intervention ===
Surgery may be required for patients with advanced cases of vertebral osteomyelitis. Spinal fusion is a common approach to destroying the microorganism causing the disease and rebuilding parts of the spine that were lost due to the infection. Fusions can be approached anteriorly or posteriorly, or both, depending on where the infection is located in the vertebral area. Spinal fusions involve cleaning the infected area of the spine and inserting instrumentation to stabilize the vertebrae and disc(s). Such instrumentation often includes bone grafts harvested from other areas of the body or from a bone bank, where bone fragments are harvested from deceased donors. The new bone graft is secured in the appropriate spinal region through the use of supporting rods and screws, most of which are made from titanium. Rods of this material promote healing and fusion of the bones more efficiently than stainless steel rods and are also more visible on MRI. In cases of severe osteolysis and instability of the ventral column, the use of vertebral body replacement implants may be necessary. These can be implanted minimally invasively thoracoscopically in the thoracolumbar spine.

== Prognosis ==
Mortality rates are noted to be higher in patients whose infection is due to the bacteria staphylococcus aureus. However, if diagnosed quickly and treated correctly, patients with staphylococcus aureus experience better outcomes than those with the disease caused by other microorganisms. The subtle progression of vertebral osteomyelitis places patients at risk for paralysis, especially if the infection is concentrated in the thoracic or cervical vertebrae. Research published in The Journal of Bone and Joint Surgery (1997) notes that most patients do not experience symptoms of the infection following surgical intervention; therefore, patients with an advanced case of vertebral osteomyelitis who undergo a surgical approach often experience better outcomes than those treated solely through intravaneous antibiotics.

== See also ==
- Myelitis, inflammation and/or infection of the spinal cord
