= Intervertebral disc =

Fibrocartilaginous structure of spine

- Intervertebral disc

Details
- Synonyms: Spinal disc, intervertebral fibrocartilage, intervertebral cartilage, vertebral disc
- Part of: Vertebral column
- System: Musculoskeletal system
- Function: Fibrocartilaginous joint between spinal vertebrae

Identifiers
- Latin: discus intervertebralis
- MeSH: D007403
- TA98: A03.2.02.003
- TA2: 1684
- FMA: 10446

An intervertebral disc (British English), also spelled intervertebral disk (American English), lies between adjacent vertebrae in the vertebral column. Each disc forms a fibrocartilaginous joint (a symphysis), to allow slight movement of the vertebrae, to act as a ligament to hold the vertebrae together, and to function as a shock absorber for the spine.

== Structure ==
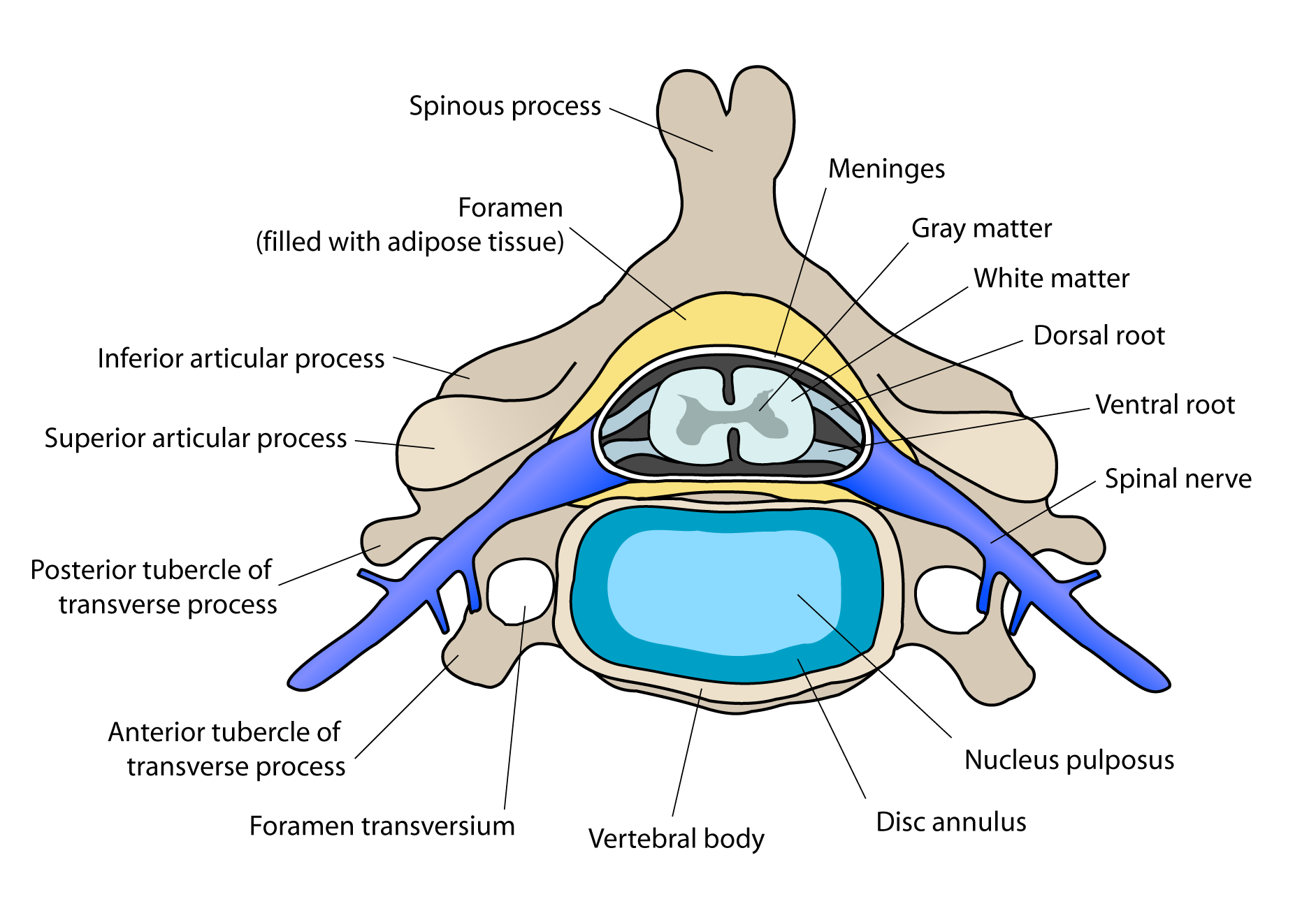
Cervical vertebra with intervertebral disc

Intervertebral discs consist of an outer fibrous ring, the anulus (or annulus) fibrosus disci intervertebralis, which surrounds an inner gel-like center, the nucleus pulposus.

The anulus fibrosus consists of several layers (laminae) of fibrocartilage made up of both type I and type II collagen. Type I is concentrated toward the edge of the ring, where it provides greater strength. The stiff laminae can withstand compressive forces.

The fibrous intervertebral disc contains the nucleus pulposus and this helps to distribute pressure evenly across the disc. This prevents the development of stress concentrations which could cause damage to the underlying vertebrae or to their endplates. The nucleus pulposus contains loose fibers suspended in a mucoprotein gel. The nucleus of the disc acts as a shock absorber, absorbing the impact of the body's activities and keeping the two vertebrae separated. It is the remnant of the notochord.

There is one disc between each pair of vertebrae, except for the first cervical segment, the atlas. The atlas is a ring around the roughly cone-shaped extension of the axis (second cervical segment). The axis acts as a post around which the atlas can rotate, allowing the neck to swivel. There are 23 discs in the human spine: 6 in the neck (cervical) region, 12 in the middle back (thoracic) region, and 5 in the lower back (lumbar) region.

Discs are named by the vertebral body above and below. For example, the disc between the fifth and sixth cervical vertebrae is designated "C5-6".

=== Development ===
During development and at birth, vertebral discs have some vascular supply to the cartilage endplates and the anulus fibrosus. These quickly deteriorate leaving almost no direct blood supply in healthy adults.

=== Intervertebral disc space ===
The intervertebral disc space is typically defined on an X-ray photograph as the space between adjacent vertebrae. In healthy patients, this corresponds to the size of the intervertebral disc. The size of the space can be altered in pathological conditions such as discitis (infection of the intervertebral disc).

== Function ==
The intervertebral disc functions to separate the vertebrae from each other and provides the surface for the shock-absorbing gel of the nucleus pulposus. The nucleus pulposus of the disc functions to distribute hydraulic pressure in all directions within each intervertebral disc under compressive loads. The nucleus pulposus consists of large vacuolated notochord cells, small chondrocyte-like cells, collagen fibrils, and aggrecan, a proteoglycan that aggregates by binding to hyaluronan. Attached to each aggrecan molecule are glycosaminoglycan (GAG) chains of chondroitin sulfate and keratan sulfate. Increasing the amount of negatively charged aggrecan increases oncotic pressure, resulting in a shift of extracellular fluid from the outside to the inside of the nucleus pulposus. The amount of glycosaminoglycans (and hence water) decreases with age and degeneration.

== Clinical significance ==
Anything arising from the intervertebral disc may be termed discogenic in particular when referring to associated pain as discogenic pain.

=== Herniation ===
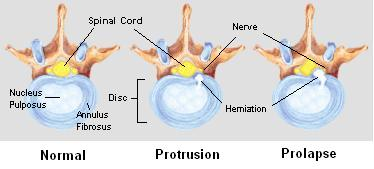
Stages of spinal disc herniation

A spinal disc herniation, commonly referred to as a slipped disc, can happen when unbalanced mechanical pressures substantially deform the anulus fibrosus, allowing part of the nucleus to obtrude. These events can occur during peak physical performance, during traumas, or as a result of chronic deterioration (typically accompanied with poor posture), and has been associated with a Propionibacterium acnes infection. Both the deformed anulus and the gel-like material of the nucleus pulposus can be forced laterally or posteriorly, distorting local muscle function and putting pressure on the nearby nerve. This can give symptoms typical of nerve root entrapment, which can vary between paresthesia, numbness, chronic and/or acute pain, either locally or along the dermatome served by the entrapped nerve, loss of muscle tone and decreased homeostatic performance. The disc is not physically slipped; it bulges, usually in just one direction.

Another kind of herniation, of the nucleus pulposus, can happen as a result of the formation of Schmorl's nodes on the intervertebral disc. This is referred to as vertical disc herniation.

=== Degeneration ===
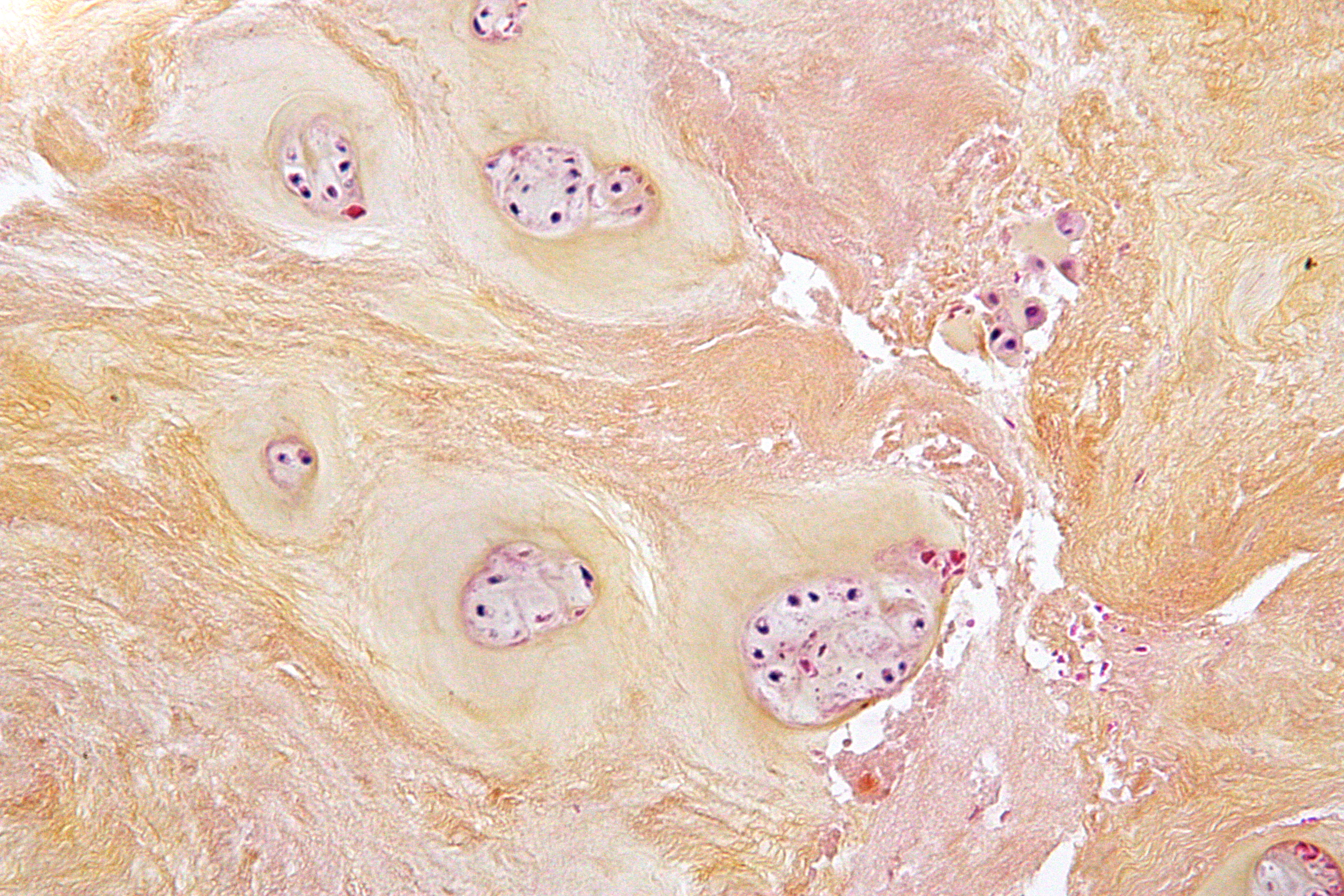
Micrograph showing a fragment of an intervertebral disc demonstrating degenerative fibrocartilage with loss of nuclei and nests of chondrocytes, as seen in degenerative disc disease. HPS stain.

Before age 40, approximately 25% of people show evidence of disc degeneration at one or more levels. Beyond age 40, more than 60% of people show evidence of disc degeneration at one or more levels on magnetic resonance imaging (MRI). These degenerative changes are a normal part of the ageing process and do not correlate to pain.

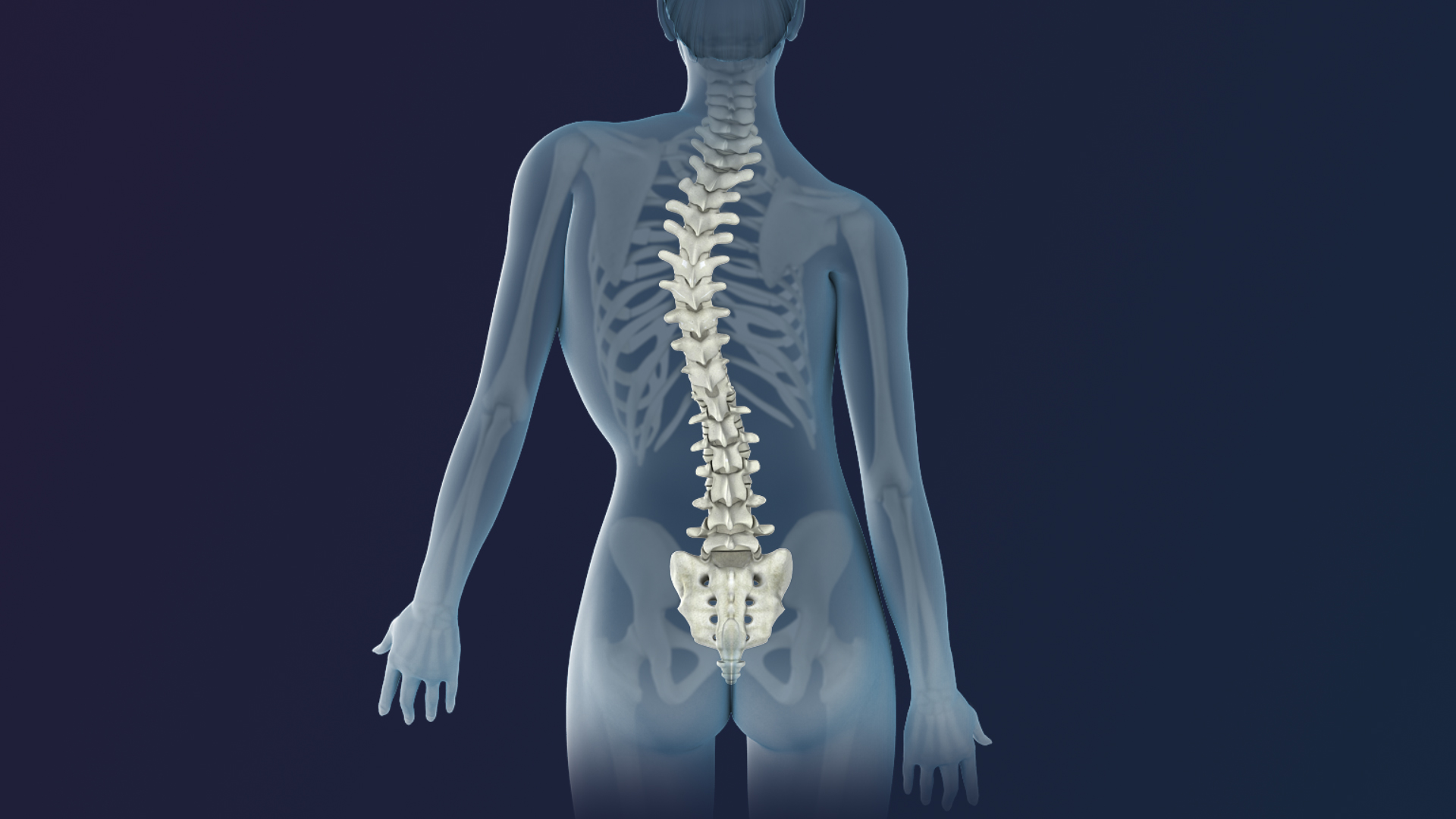
3D medical animation still shot of scoliosis

One effect of aging and disc degeneration is that the nucleus pulposus begins to dehydrate and the concentration of proteoglycans in the matrix decreases, thus limiting the ability of the disc to absorb shock. This general shrinking of disc size is partially responsible for the common decrease in height as humans age. The anulus fibrosus also becomes weaker with age and has an increased risk of tearing. In addition, the cartilage endplates begin thinning, fissures begin to form, and there is sclerosis of the subchondral bone. Since the fissures are formed in the anulus fibrosus due to osteo-arthritic bones or degeneration in general, the inner nucleus pulposus can seep out and put pressure on any number of vertebral nerves. A herniated disc can cause mild to severe pain such as sciatica and treatment for herniated discs range from physical therapy to surgery. (see also: Intervertebral disc arthroplasty) Other degeneration of the vertebral column includes diffuse idiopathic skeletal hyperostosis (DISH) which is the calcification or ossification of the ligaments surrounding the vertebrae. This degeneration causes stiffness and sometimes even curvature in the lumbar and thoraco-lumbar spinal region. Burgeoning evidence suggests that long-term running may mitigate age-related degeneration within lumbar intervertebral discs.

=== Scoliosis ===
While this may not cause pain in some people, in others it may cause chronic pain. Other spinal disorders can affect the morphology of intervertebral discs. For example, patients with scoliosis commonly have calcium deposits (ectopic calcification) in the cartilage endplate and sometimes in the disc itself. Herniated discs are also found to have a higher degree of cellular senescence than non-herniated discs. In addition to scoliosis, which is the lateral 'S' curvature of the spine, the fused vertebrae can also experience other abnormalities such as kyphosis (hunchback) which shows in old age, or lordosis (swayback), which is often present in pregnancy and obesity.

== Etymology ==
The Latin word anulus means "little ring"; it is the diminutive of anus ("ring"). However, modern English also spells the word more phonetically annulus, as with the term annular eclipse, where the moon blocks the sun except for a bright ring around it.

== Additional images ==
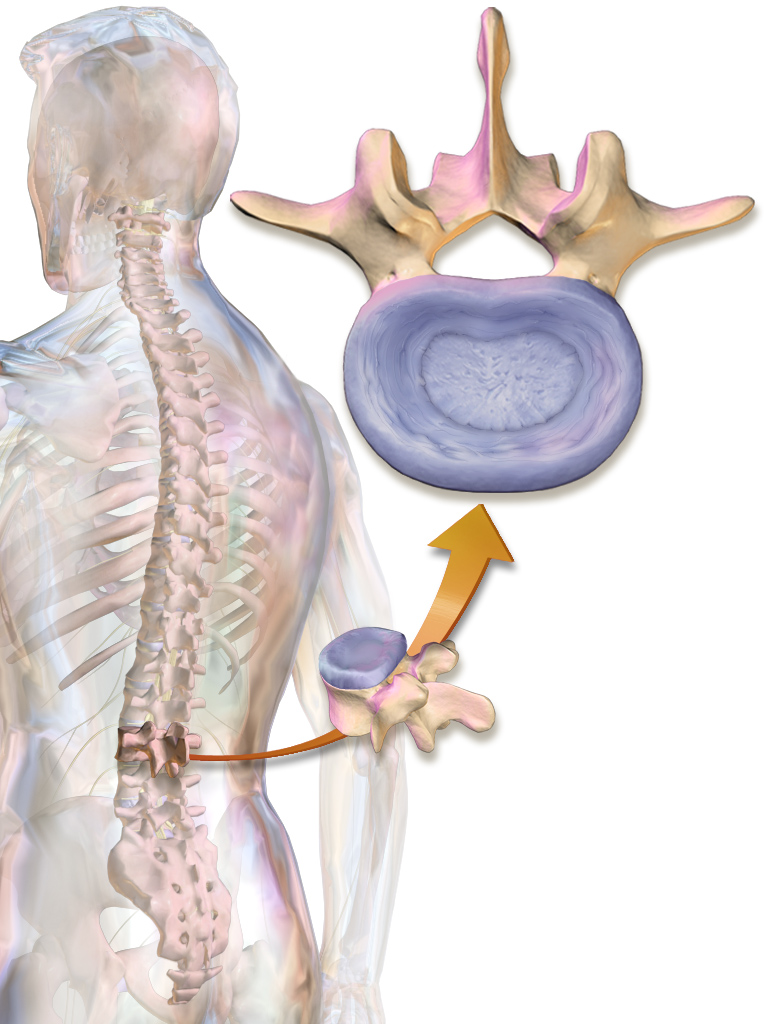
Anulus fibrosus

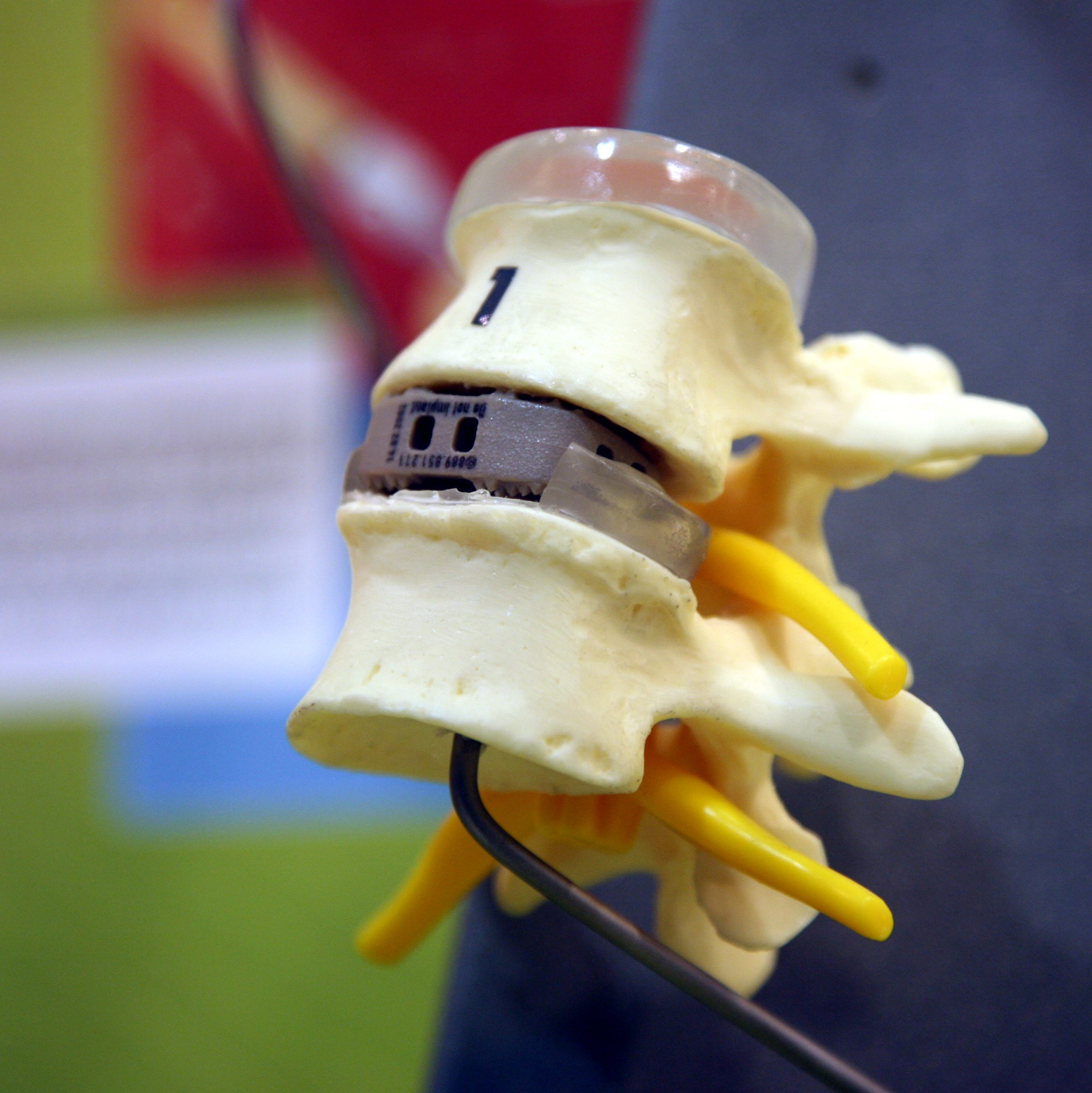
Artificial intervertebral disc

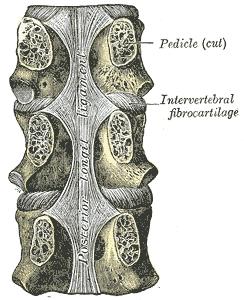
Posterior longitudinal ligament, in the thoracic region

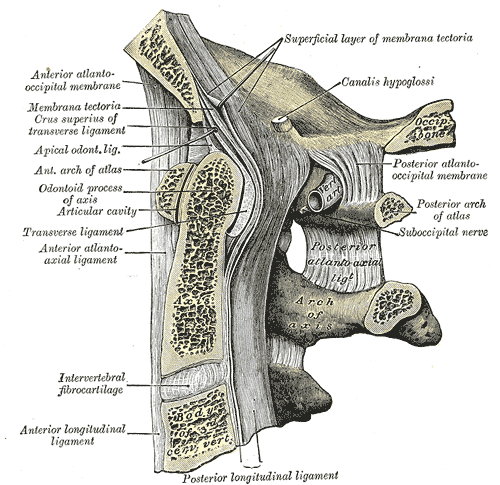
Median sagittal section through the occipital bone and first three cervical vertebrae

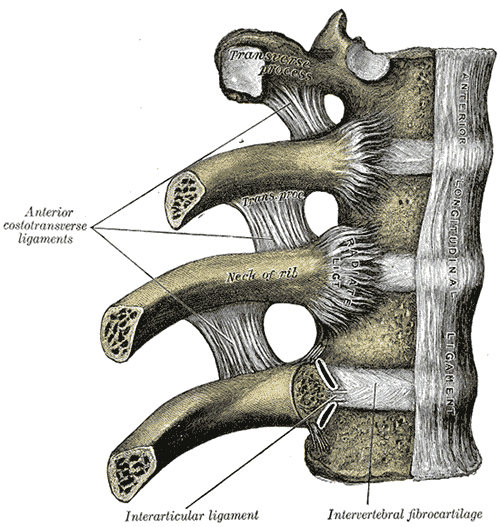
Costovertebral articulations. Anterior view.

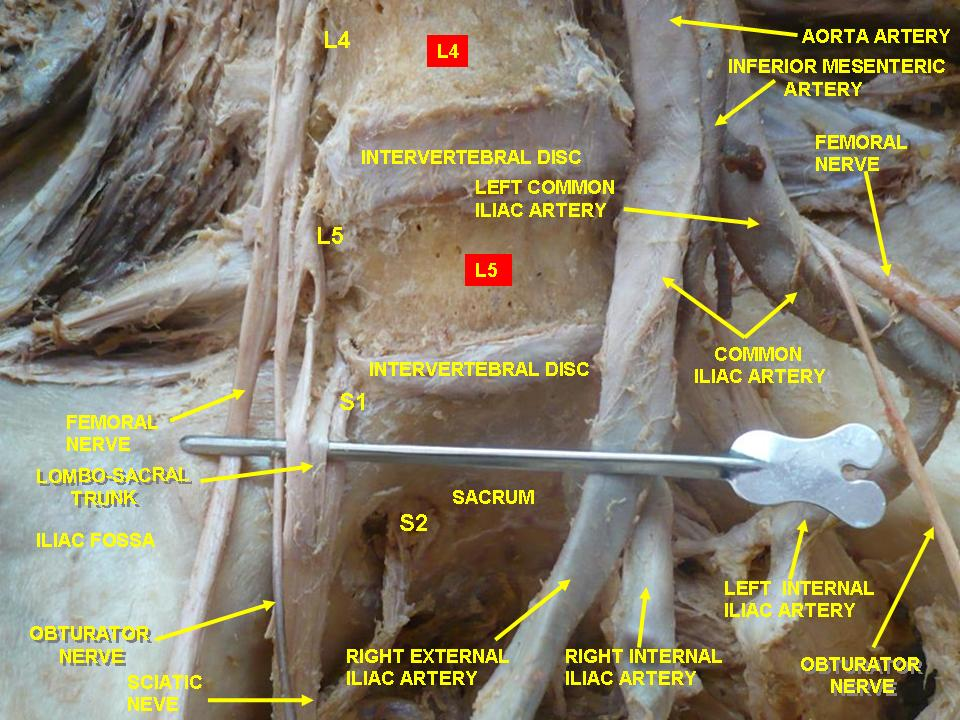
Lumbar and sacral plexus. Deep dissection. Anterior view.

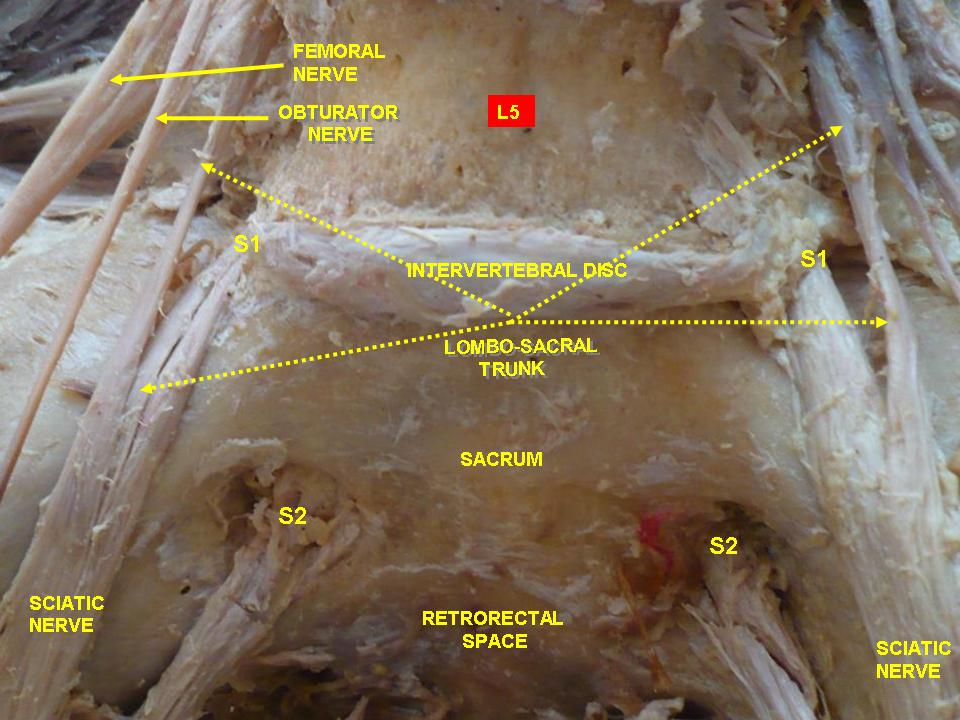
Lumbar and sacral plexus. Deep dissection. Anterior view.

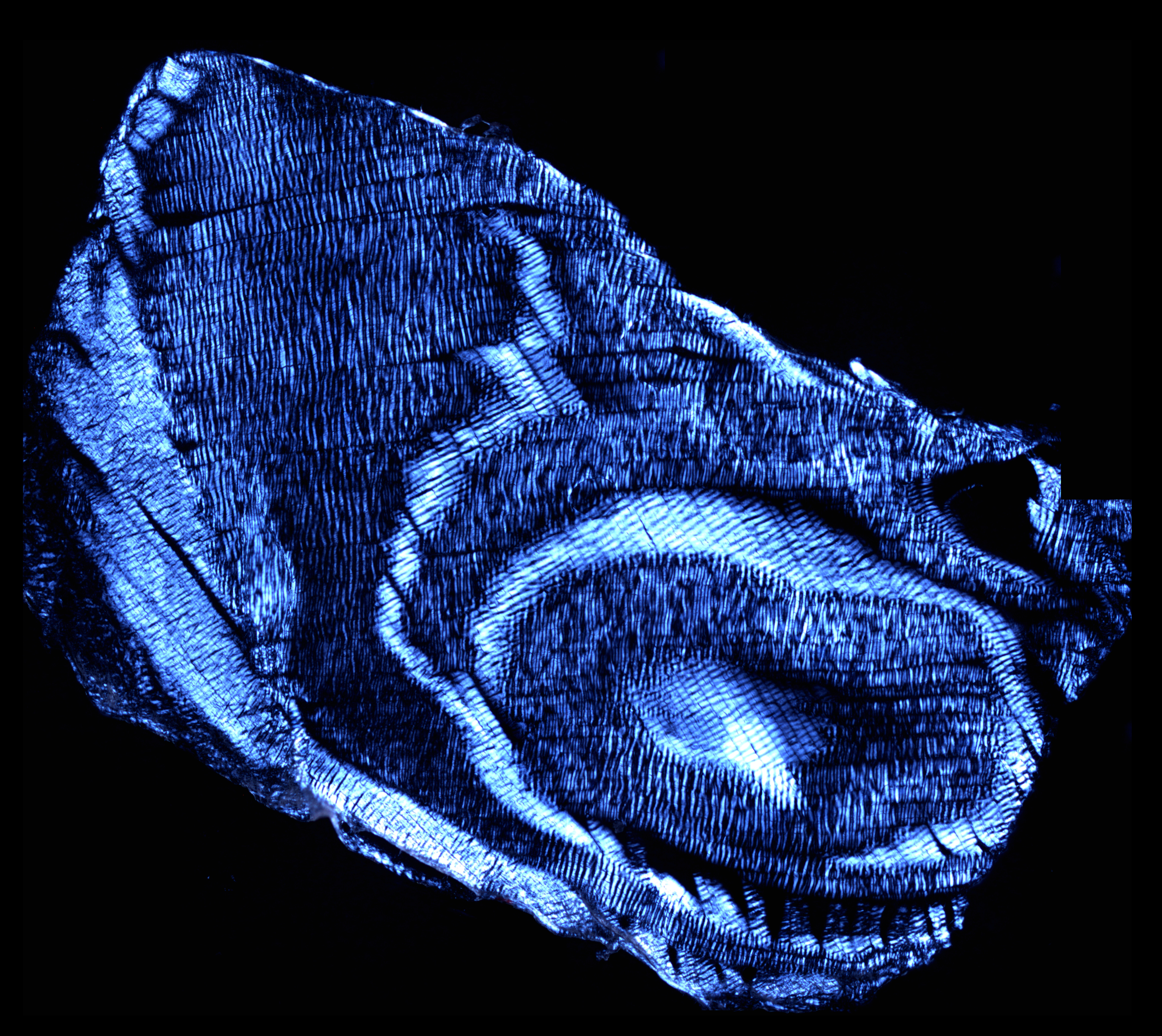
Polarised light microscopy image of the annulus fibrosus, showing the concentric layers of fibrous tissue

== See also ==
- Back pain
- Degenerative disc disease
- Spinal disc herniation
- Spinal decompression
- Lumbar spinal stenosis
- List of distinct cell types in the adult human body
- Spelling of disc
