= Splenii muscle =

Splenii muscle may refer to:

- Splenius capitis muscle
- Splenius cervicis muscle
