= Occipital branch =

Occipital branch may refer to

- Occipital branch of posterior auricular artery
- Occipital branches of occipital artery
- Occipital branches of posterior auricular nerve
