= Helicis major =

Muscle of the outer ear

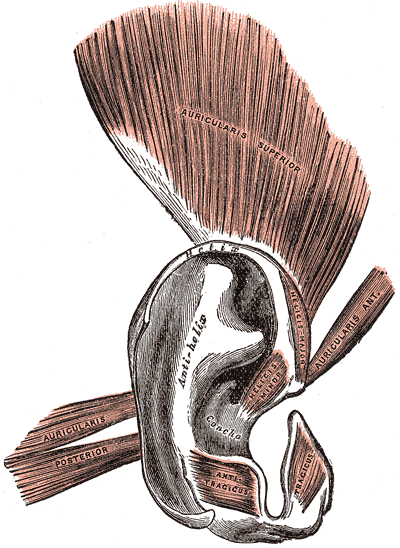
- The muscles of the ear (Helicis major visible at center right).

Details
- Origin: Spina helicis
- Insertion: Anterior border of the helix
- Artery: Auricular branches of posterior auricular and auricular branch of occipital arteries
- Nerve: Facial nerve

Identifiers
- Latin: musculus helicis major
- TA98: A15.3.01.037
- TA2: 2093
- FMA: 48968

The helicis major (or large muscle of helix) is an intrinsic muscle of the outer ear.

In human anatomy, it is the form of a narrow vertical band situated upon the anterior margin of the helix, at the point where the helix becomes transverse.

It arises below, from the spina helicis, and is inserted into the anterior border of the helix, just where it is about to curve backward.

The function of the muscle is to adjust the shape of the ear by depressing the anterior margin of the ear cartilage. While the muscle modifies the auricular shape only minimally in the majority of individuals, this action could increase the opening into the external acoustic meatus in some.

The helicis major is developmentally derived from the second pharyngeal arch. It seems that only in primates are the helicis minor and helicis major two distinct muscles.

== Additional images ==
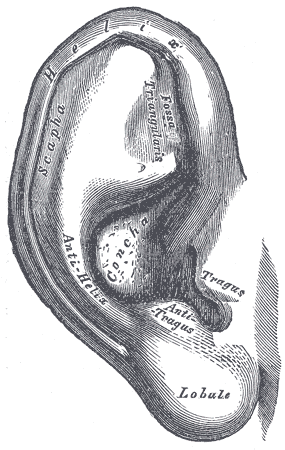
Anatomy of human ear

== See also ==
- Intrinsic muscles of external ear
- Helicis minor
