= Arm span =

Distance from finger tips to finger tips

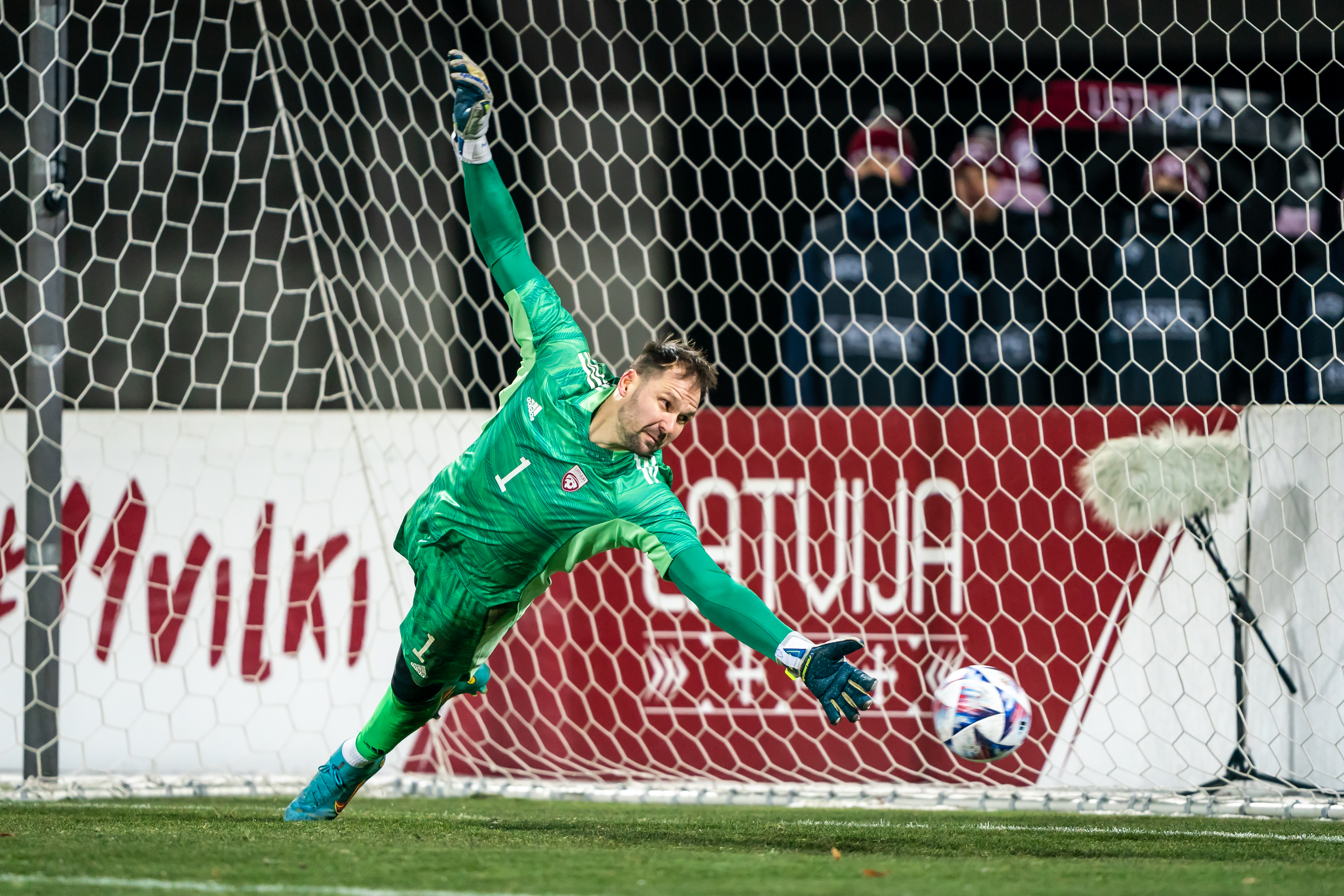
Arm span and functional reach is important in football and many other sports.

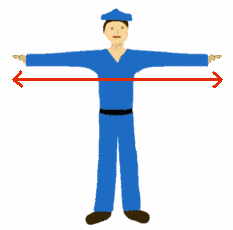

Arm span or reach (sometimes referred to as wingspan, or spelled armspan) is the physical measurement of the length from one end of an individual's arms (measured at the fingertips) to the other when raised parallel to the ground at shoulder height at a 90° angle. The arm span measurement is usually very close to the person's height. Age, sex, and ethnicity have to be taken into account to best predict height from arm span. Arm span may be used as a height measurement when it cannot be obtained for health reasons.

== Arm span in sports ==
An above-average reach may be advantageous in sports such as Australian rules football, basketball, tennis, boxing, mixed martial arts, volleyball, discus throw, fencing, rock climbing, and swimming. For instance, boxer Sonny Liston, while 185 cm (6 ft 1 in) tall, had a reach of 213 cm (7 ft 0 in). Another example is former UFC Heavyweight and Light Heavyweight Champion Jon Jones, who is 193 cm (6 ft 4 in) tall, but has an advantageous reach of 215 cm (7 ft 0.5 in). This unusually long reach has allowed them to hit from relatively safe distances where opposing fighters cannot hit back. However, a long arm span is mechanically disadvantageous on the bench press.

=== Arm span, functional reach and joint centration ===
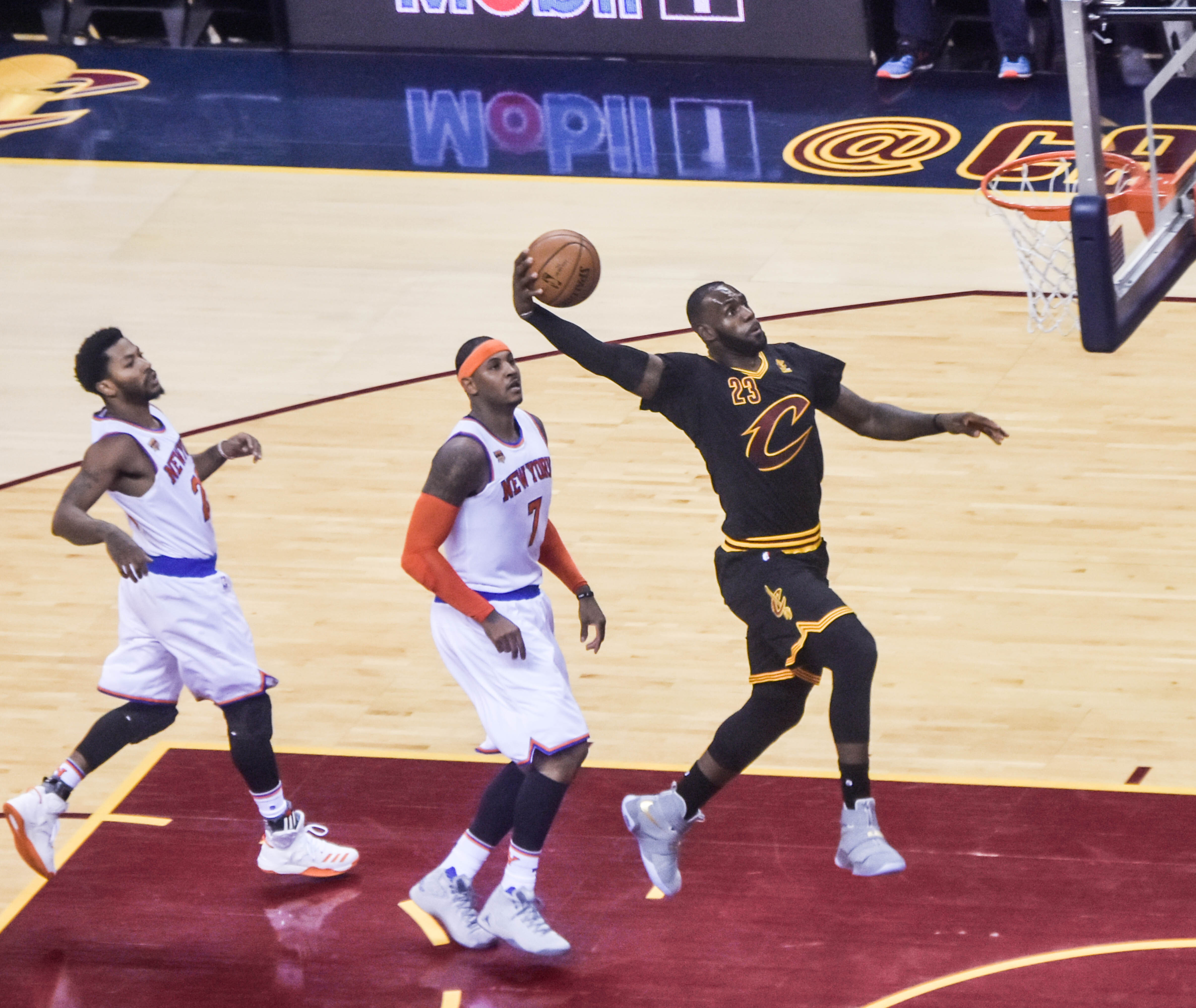
Arm span and the functional reach which is influenced by it is an important factor in basketball and other sports.

A person's arm span is influenced by the positioning and alignment of their joints and especially their shoulder joints. Joint centration is when joints are optimally positioned and aligned in a centered way both when a person is still and when they are moving. In regard to the shoulders, whereby they are centrated they are broader set and the arm span is increased. This is considered relatively to if they were decentrated i.e. if the shoulders were hunched forwards as part of a person's usual posture, they would not be optimally positioned and aligned and their arm span would be reduced.

Neck (cervical spine) decentration is a primary catalyst for shoulder decentration due to the way in which the joints influence each other in a kinetic chain. For example, a person with the forward head posture condition will also usually have the rounded shoulder posture condition. As such, in order to achieve maximum arm span, without straining, it is also necessary that the neck, and other joints, are also positioned and aligned optimally. Arm span influences a person's functional reach (how far they can reach forward to achieve a practical goal while maintaining their sense of balance) and the biomechanical leverage which can be applied by their arms. Both of which are useful in many competitive physical events. For these reasons, sport and athletic training regimes seek to optimise a person's arm span and maximise functional reach efficiency by performing various exercises which centrate the joints, thereby also improving their respective stability and mobility, and enhance postural control. Such sports include basketball, baseball, tennis, boxing and MMA.

== Procedure ==
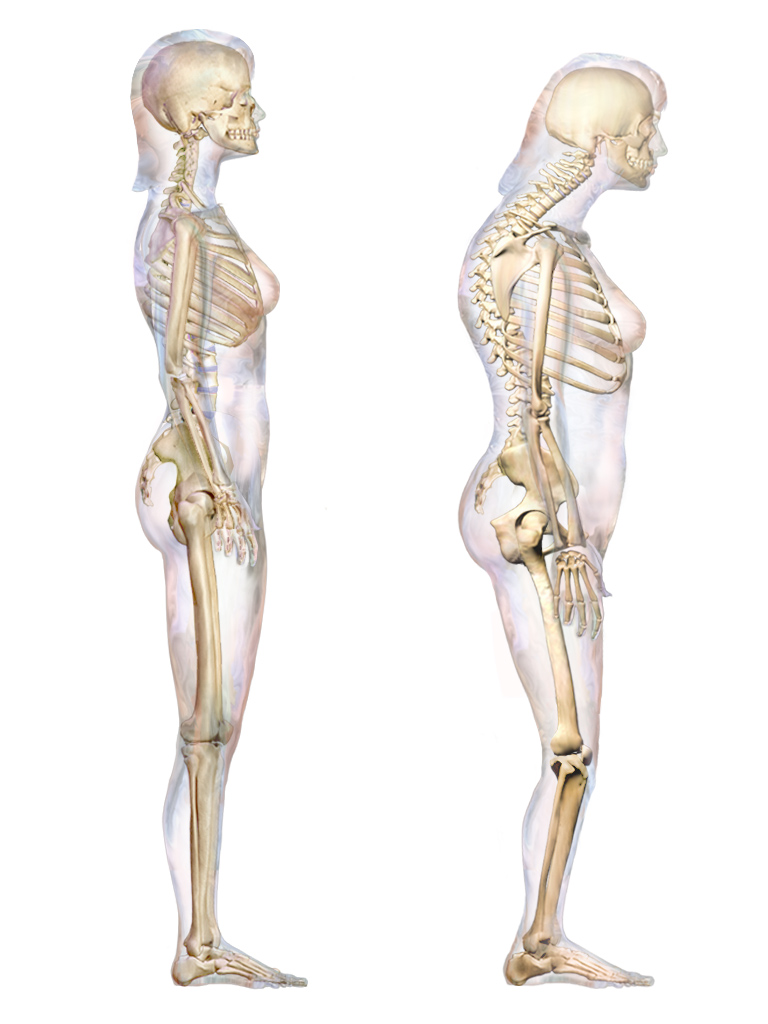
A person with Kyphosis (right) will also have rounded shoulder posture and forward head posture meaning that their arm span and functional reach is reduced.

The most common and easily accessible method of measuring armspan uses the demi-span. Using a tape measure, measure from the individual's sternal notch (center of the breastbone) to their middle finger as it is stretched out to one side, then double the demi-span for the actual armspan measurement. Demi-span is used because measuring from fingertip to fingertip is difficult, requiring two people or markings on a wall.

=== Height estimation in healthcare ===
Direct measurement of height may be impractical for patients who are missing limbs, bedridden, wheelchair users, afflicted with certain skeletal conditions such as scoliosis or osteoporosis, or elderly. Arm span may be measured instead for such individuals. The ratio of height to arm span is traditionally considered 1 to 1.03 for men and 1 to 1.01 for women, with arm span being slightly longer than height. However, modern algorithms also take ethnicity, age, and sex into account when calculating height from arm span. Other, possibly more accurate measuring techniques include knee length or recumbent length.

Because any decrease in height will cause an increase in the ratio of arm span to height, a large span to height ratio may sometimes be an indicator of a health problem that caused a vertical height loss such as postural changes due to ageing or any spinal conditions such as degenerative disc disease.

== See also ==
- Ape index
- Human body
- Marfan syndrome – high limbs to height ratio
- Fathom
