= Helicis minor =

Muscle of the outer ear

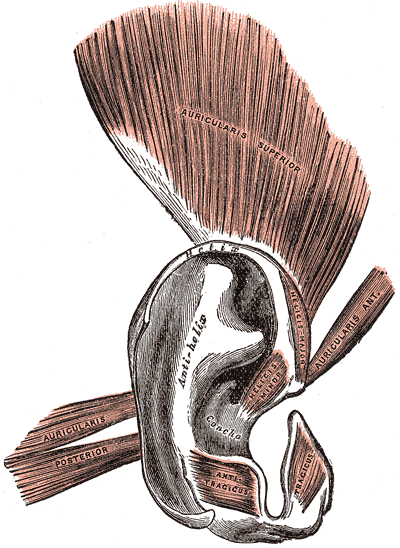
- The muscles of the auricula (Helicis minor visible at center)

Details
- Origin: Base of the helical crus
- Insertion: Anterior aspect of the helical crus
- Artery: Auricular branches of posterior auricular and auricular branch of occipital arteries
- Nerve: Posterior auricular nerve a branch of the facial nerve
- Actions: Adjusting the shape of the anterior margin of the ear cartilage

Identifiers
- Latin: musculus helicis minor
- TA98: A15.3.01.038
- TA2: 2094
- FMA: 48971

The Helicis minor (musculus helicis minor or smaller muscle of helix) is a small skeletal muscle. The helicis minor is an intrinsic muscle of the outer ear. The muscle runs obliques and covers the helical crus, part of the helix located just above the tragus.

The helicis minor originates from the base of the helical crus, runs obliques and inserts at the anterior aspect of the helical crus where it curves upward above the tragus.

The function of the muscle is to assist in adjusting the shape of the anterior margin of the ear cartilage. While this is a potential action in some individuals, in the majority of individuals the muscle modifies auricular shape to a minimal degree.

The helicis minor is developmentally derived from the second pharyngeal arch It seem that only in primates is the helicis major and minor two distinctive muscles.

== Additional images ==
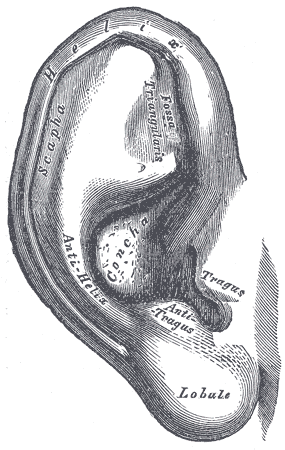
Anatomy of human ear

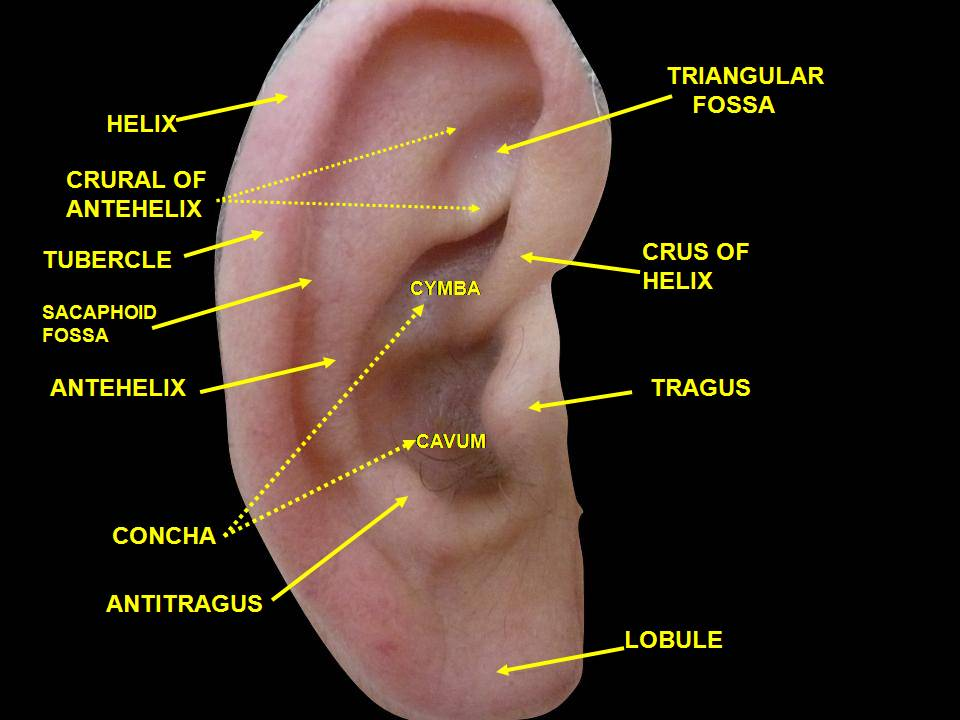
External ear. Right auricle.Lateral view.

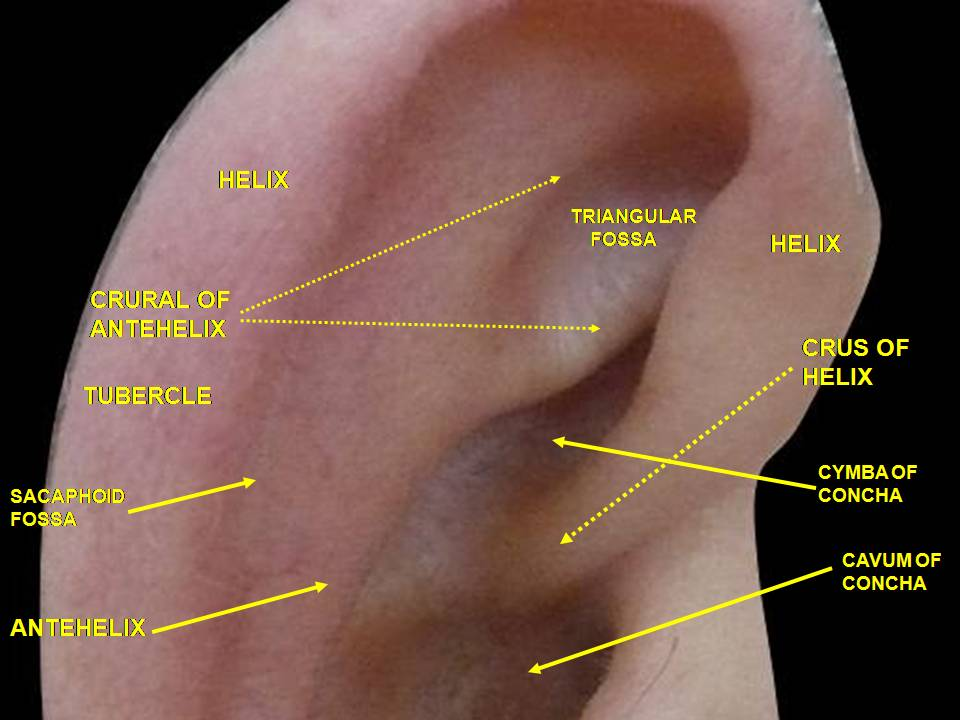
External ear. Right auricle.Lateral view.

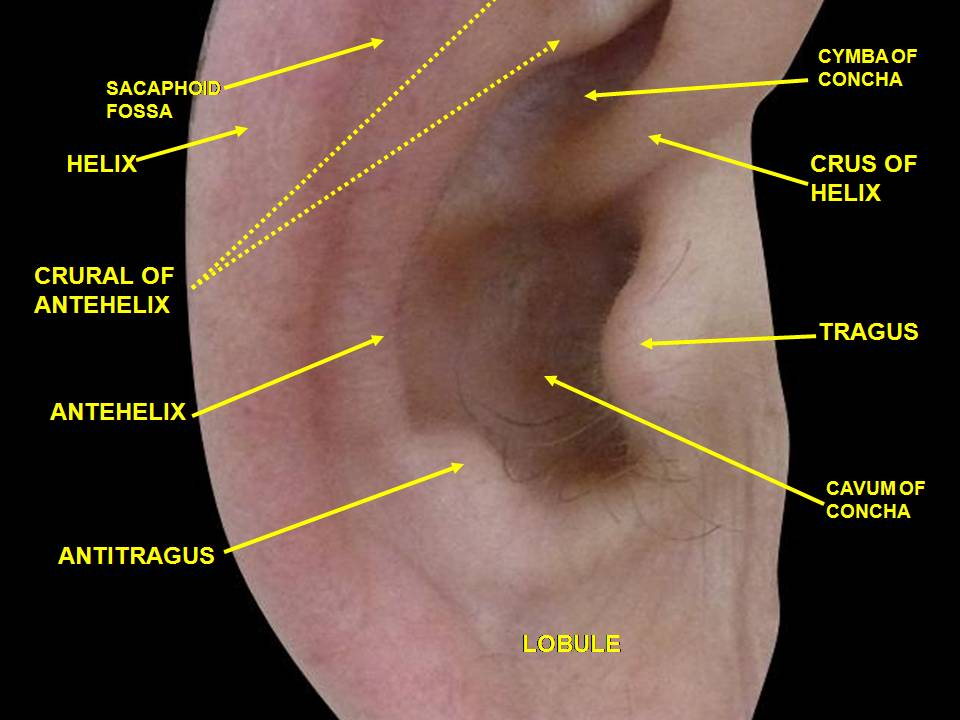
External ear. Right auricle.Lateral view.

== See also ==
- Intrinsic muscles of external ear
- Helicis major
