= Sternocleidomastoid artery =

Sternocleidomastoid artery can refer to:

- Sternocleidomastoid branches of occipital artery
- Sternocleidomastoid branch of superior thyroid artery
