= FHP =

FHP may refer to:

== Health and medicine ==
- Feminine hygiene product
- Foot health practitioner
- Forward head posture

== Other uses ==
- Fachhochschule Potsdam, a vocational college in Germany
- Florida Highway Patrol
- Fractional horsepower
- François-Henri Pinault (born 1962), French businessman
- Fynn Hudson-Prentice (born 1996), English cricketer
- Heppenheim (Bergstraße) station, in Germany
- Binhai West railway station, China Railway telegraph code FHP
