= Sternocleidomastoid branch =

Sternocleidomastoid branch may refer to:

- Sternocleidomastoid branch of superior thyroid artery
- Sternocleidomastoid branches of occipital artery
