= Descending branch =

Descending branch may refer to:

- Anterior descending branch of the profunda brachii artery, also known as the radial collateral artery
- Descending branch of lateral circumflex femoral artery
- Descending branch of occipital artery
