= Descending branch of occipital artery =

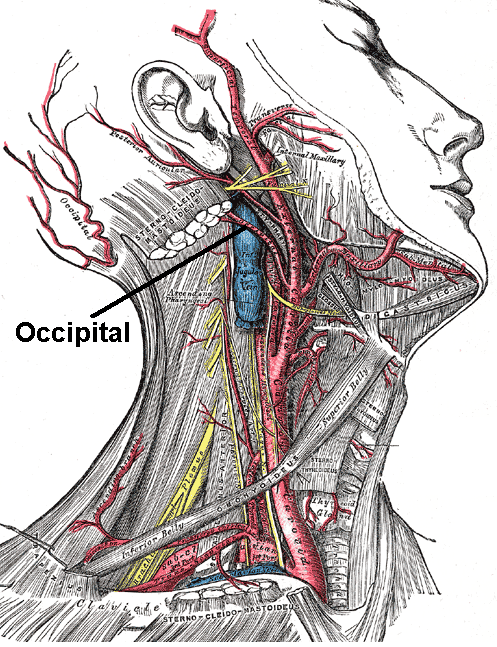
- Superficial dissection of the right side of the neck, showing the carotid and subclavian arteries.

Details
- Source: occipital artery

Identifiers
- Latin: ramus descendens arteriae occipitalis
- TA98: A12.2.05.036
- TA2: 4404
- FMA: 49608

The descending branch of occipital artery, the largest branch of the occipital, descends on the back of the neck, and divides into a superficial and deep portion.

- The superficial portion runs beneath the splenius, giving off branches which pierce that muscle to supply the trapezius and anastomose with the ascending branch of the transverse cervical.
- The deep portion runs down between the semispinales capitis and colli, and anastomoses with the vertebral and with the a. profunda cervicalis, a branch of the costocervical trunk.

The anastomosis between these vessels assists in establishing the collateral circulation after ligature of the common carotid or subclavian artery.
