= Splenius muscles =

Muscle

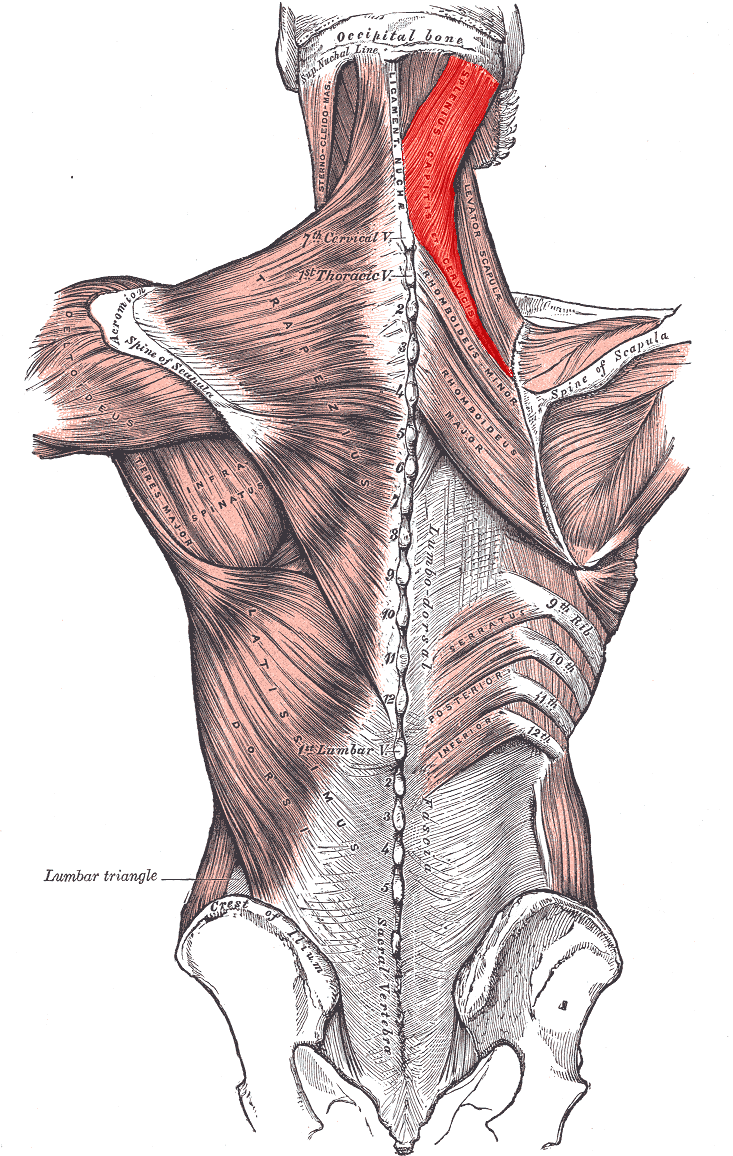

Details

Identifiers
- Latin: musculus splenius
- TA98: A04.3.02.102
- TA2: 2272
- FMA: 77180

The splenius muscles are:

- Splenius capitis muscle
- Splenius cervicis muscle

Their origins are in the upper thoracic and lower cervical spinous processes. Their actions are to extend and ipsilaterally rotate the head and neck.
