= Occipital branch of posterior auricular artery =

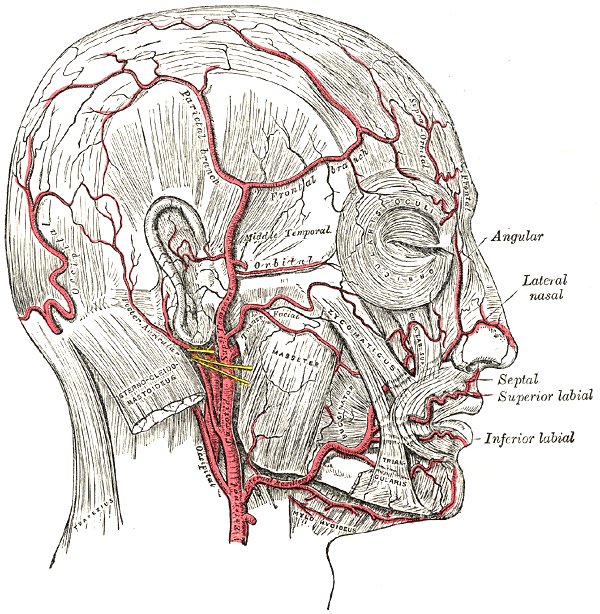
- The arteries of the face and scalp.

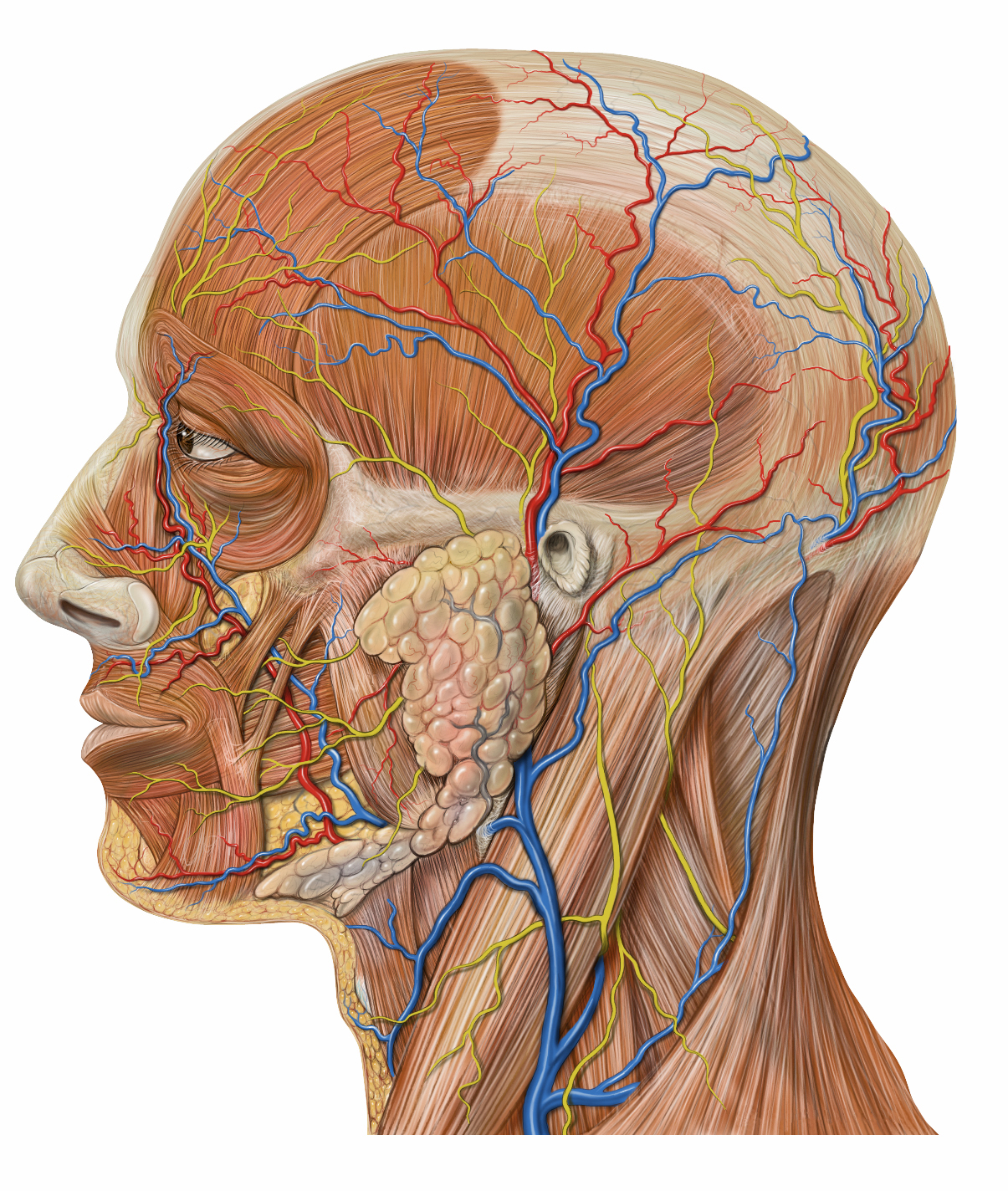
- Lateral head anatomy detail

Details
- Source: posterior auricular artery

Identifiers
- Latin: ramus occipitalis arteriae auricularis posterioris
- TA98: A12.2.05.043; A14.2.01.103
- TA2: 4411
- FMA: 49644

The occipital branch of posterior auricular artery passes backward, over the Sternocleidomastoideus, to the scalp above and behind the ear. It supplies the Occipitalis and the scalp in this situation and anastomoses with the occipital artery.
