= Forward head posture =

Spinal condition

Forward head posture (FHP) is an excessively kyphotic (hunched) thoracic spine. It is clinically recognized as a form of repetitive strain injury. The posture can occur in dentists, surgeons, hairdressers, and people who spend time on electronic devices. It is one of the most common postural problems. There is a correlation between forward head posture and neck pain in adults, but not adolescents.

Having both forward head posture and rounded shoulders is known as upper crossed syndrome.

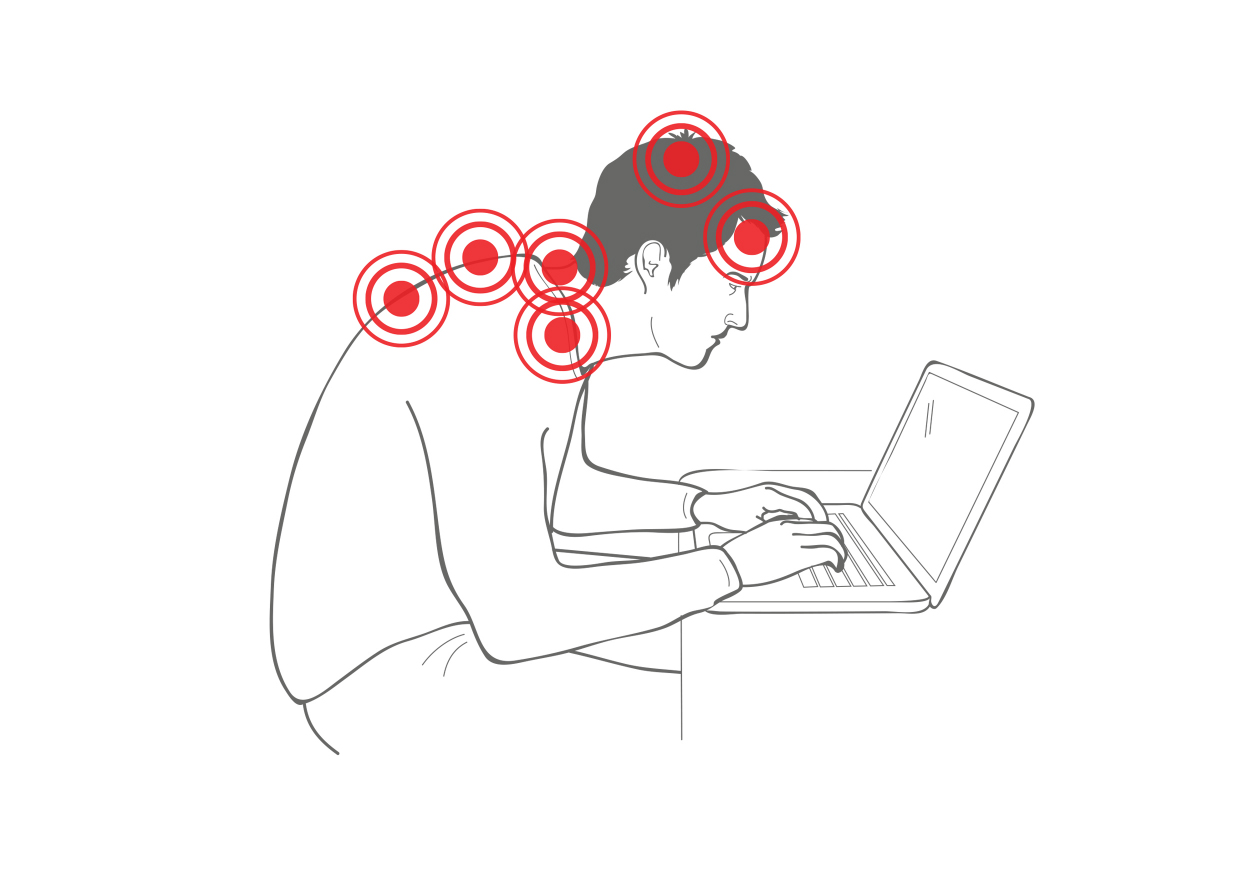
(1) Overworked muscles down the back of the neck strengthen, strain, scar and shorten; (2) middle and lower back support muscles weaken; (3) hunching upper back joints eventually freeze like that; (4) muscles at the front of the neck work less and weaken, so chin pokes out.

== Overview ==
Indications are that the prevalence of upper back and neck pain has increased dramatically in the decade leading up to 2016. This increase has been attributed to the corresponding widespread adoption of laptop computers, tablets, smartphones and other small portable digital devices.

Because their screens do not separate from their keyboards these small devices cannot be set up ergonomically correctly (unless an extra screen or extra keyboard is added). They are unlike personal desk top computers (PCs) in this respect. Most commonly, the user hunches to operate them, often for many hours a day.

Hunching increases the effective load on the neck up to several times more than does erect posture, due to increasing moment arm. Local pain, cervicogenic headache and referred pain extending down the arms can arise from the sustained muscle strain, cervical facet joint (or apophyseal, or zygapophyseal joint) compression and diminution of the cervical foraminal nerve exits.

Treatment may include regular breaks while using mobile devices, strengthening and stretching of the neck and upper back muscles, massage, spinal manipulation and mobilisation, posture awareness, and the use of ergonomic tools. Biomechanical analysis suggests a combination of approaches is best and gives more lasting results.

== Signs and symptoms ==
In a neck with perfect posture (as seen for instance in young children) the head is balanced above the shoulders. In this position the load on each vertebra of the cervical spine is spread evenly between the two facet (apophyseal) joints at the back and the intervertebral disc and vertebral body at the front.

The condition is characterised by a posture with vagi at the head sitting somewhat forward of the shoulders (i.e., the ear lobe is anterior to a vertical line through the point of the shoulder (acromion process)). This can be very marked, with the back of the skull positioned anterior to the breastbone (sternum). The chin is poked forward.

When the patient is asked to look up at the ceiling, the hunched-forward upper thoracic curve does not change as viewed from the side. Rather, the lower cervical spine 'hinges' backward at C5/6/7, a movement pattern known as 'swan-necking'.

This indicates that the upper back vertebrae have frozen in their habitual flexed positions, with the surrounding collagen of the ligaments, joint capsules and fascia shortening to reinforce this hypomobility. (This is the dowager's hump of the elderly of earlier generations, now observable in modern (2016) late teenagers.)

Symptoms include overuse muscle pain and fatigue along the back of the neck and reaching down to the mid-back, often starting with the upper trapezius muscle bellies between the shoulders and neck. Cervicogenic headache from the joints and muscle attachments at the top of the neck is common.

The compressive load on the cervical facet joints predisposes to acute joint locking episodes, with pain and movement loss. In older patients with already diminished cervical foramina spaces or osteophytes, nerve root irritation and impingement can trigger referred pain down the arm(s).

== Causes ==
The human spine is well suited to erect upright posture, with the increased heart rate from movement shunting a good blood supply to the muscles. This is clearly not the case for vast numbers of sedentary humans spending many hours daily bent over laptops, tablets, smartphones and similar. A biomechanical assessment of thoracic hunching shows the abnormal spinal loading and other effects which plausibly account for the recent steep rise in thoracic and cervical pain in step with the ubiquitous adoption of the small IT devices.

The gravity of stress on the spine dramatically increases with thoracic hunching, roughly 10 pounds of weight are added to the cervical spine in weight for every inch of forward head posture by looking down at a small IT device. As a consequence there is growing medical concern specifically with children as their head size is larger in relation to their body and thus pose an increased risk group for being affected by musculoskeletal and neurological issues in the neck caused by thoracic hunching.

Hunching has always caused problems, for instance in occupational groups like dentists, surgeons, hairdressers, nurses, chefs, teachers, computer workers and students. Some rheumatoid conditions like ankylosing spondylitis, neurodegenerative conditions like Parkinson's disease, and connective tissue disorders like Ehlers–Danlos syndrome cause characteristic excessive thoracic kyphosis. What has changed is the amount of hunching in society generally, and especially with the technologically adept young.

== Epidemiology ==
The first laptop was produced in 1981 but it took more than a decade of development for the designs to approach current (2016) levels of portability and capacity, and hence uptake. Apple popularized smartphones with the iPhone in 2007 and tablets with the iPad in 2010. In 2015 there were 4.43 billion mobile phone (cellphone) users in the world, of which 2.6 billion had smartphones. In the US, 45% owned a tablet computer in 2014 and 92% owned a mobile phone; for younger adults aged 18–29, only 2% did not own a mobile phone and 50% had tablets.

A large Finnish cross-sectional study on school-age adolescents published in 2012 concluded that more than two hours a day spent on computers was associated with a moderate/severe increase in musculoskeletal pain. In the following year, the average UK 18–24 year-old spent 8.83 hours a day in front of a PC, laptop or tablet. Neck pain per se has been a large problem for a long time, and surveyed repeatedly. A composite review of studies with good methodology by Fejer et al. published in 2006 found that point prevalence (in pain right now) of neck pain in the adult (15–75 years) population ranged from 5.9% to 22.2%, with one study of the elderly (65+ years) finding 38.7% were in pain when surveyed. Generally, more urban populations had more neck pain, e.g. 22.2% of a large 1998 Canadian study had neck pain when surveyed.

Based on these surveys of neck pain prevalence, and adding to them the prevalence of thoracic pain and cervicogenic headache, it is reasonable to estimate that around one adult in six (15%) probably has pain in any, some or all of those areas right now. However the published epidemiological papers draw on raw data from surveys done at least 10 years ago, and there are indications that the numbers have been rising dramatically since then – as rapidly as the adoption of laptops, tablets and smartphones. This is reflected in the recent rise in the number of popular articles, news items and media discussions about the problem.

== Pathogenesis ==
The condition is a multi-factorial problem.

- Thoracic hunching requires flexing of the thoracic facet joints. After sufficient time and load, they can freeze and lock in this position. The collagen of the surrounding ligaments, fascia and joint capsules will shorten down around the immobile joints, reinforcing the hunched hypomobile section of spine.
- The middle back support muscles (erector spinae, rhomboids, middle and lower trapezius fibres, etc.) become stretched out and weak.
- The cantilevered (poked forward) head position loads the spine up to several times more than erect posture, because of the increased moment arm. So the posterior neck muscles (especially the upper fibres of trapezius) holding the head in its forward position, often sustained for many hours, can strain, producing individual myofibril and cell damage. Repair of this microtrauma involves the laying down of adhesive fibrosis, as a normal part of the inflammatory response. Adhesive fibrosis is relatively non-elastic, so after sufficient repeated microtrauma from muscle strain, the posterior neck muscles become strained, shortened and less elastic.
- In this same cantilevered head position, the longus colli muscles and other deep neck flexors around the front of the neck are hardly being used, so they become weak, allowing the chin to poke out.
- The combined effect of all the above in the cantilevered head position, with the chin poked out, is to compress every facet joint in the cervical spine. This predisposes to acute locking episodes. At the top of the cervical spine, this often manifests as cervicogenic headache, with pain referring over the head from the C0/1, C1/2, and/or C2/3 joints, and from the insertion of the upper trapezius fibres onto the nuchal line of the occiput. In older patients, especially with osteophytes and/or where the intervertebral foramina are already diminished, this compression and further reduction of the foraminal spaces can result in irritation and impingement of the nerve roots, referring pain some distance down the arm(s).

== Treatment ==
Neck pain generally has been treated with a profusion of approaches and modalities, including nonsteroidal anti-inflammatory drugs (NSAIDs) such as ibuprofen; pain relief medications (analgesics) such as acetaminophen; low dose tricyclic antidepressants such as amitriptyline for chronic problems; physical therapy (a.k.a. physiotherapy in British-derived cultures) which utilises a wide range of techniques and modalities; spinal manipulation from osteopaths, manipulating physiotherapists and spinal adjustments from chiropractors; massage; muscle strengthening programmes including gyms and Pilates; postural approaches such as the Alexander Technique; stretching approaches such as yoga; ergonomic approaches including setting up desktop computers correctly and frequent breaks; and surgery for severe structural problems such as osteophytic impingement on the cervical nerve roots and cervical disc herniation.

A biomechanical analysis of the pathology indicates its standard, logical development from much flexed activity and its multi-factorial character. (See Pathogenesis above.)

A composite approach which covers each component of the problem is therefore likely to be most successful and lasting. Most of the general treatment approaches to neck pain cover only one aspect. A logical response should include as a minimum:

- Strengthening, especially of (1) the middle and lower back support muscles and scapula retractors, and (2) the longus colli and the deep neck flexor muscles.
- Stretching muscles that cause neck protrusion, especially of the upper fibres of the trapezius muscle.
  - Lower cervical flexors: sternocleidomastoid, anterior and middle scalene muscles.
  - Upper cervical (capital) extensors: semispinalis capitis, longissimus capitis, splenius capitis, suboccipital muscles
- Strengthening muscles that cause neck retraction:
  - Lower cervical extensors: splenius cervicis, semispinalis cervicis, longissimus cervicis
  - Upper cervical (capital) flexors: longus capitis, Rectus capitis anterior, Suprahyoid muscles
- Massage, to loosen adhesive fibrotic tethering of the posterior neck and upper trapezius muscles.
- Unlocking of the hypomobile (frozen) facet joints of the thoracic spine and stretching of the shortened collagen reinforcing the excessive kyphosis (hunch). A sufficiently tight patch of thoracic spine cannot be freed up solely by patient exercises, stretches or movements. This is due to leverage – with any general exercise, the segments of the spine that are moving well will tend to move more, reducing the leverage on the hypomobile segments. A sufficiently localised external force is then necessary, such as specific hands-on spinal mobilisation or manipulation. A randomized clinical trial by Cleland et al. showed manipulation of the thoracic spine reduced neck pain immediately.
- However unless the surrounding shortened collagen also receives sufficient stretching, collagen rebound will tend to freeze up the facet joint again rapidly. Collagen is stronger by weight than steel wire and is best stretched by a sufficiently long, strong, localised, passive stretch. In practical terms this may be achieved by the hunched patient lying back on a spinal fulcrum device, which uses the upper body weight to provide the external force, localised over the fulcrum.

== See also ==
- Spondylopathy
