= Occipital branches of occipital artery =

Details
- Source: occipital artery

Identifiers
- Latin: rami occipitales arteriae occipitalis
- TA98: A12.2.05.034
- TA2: 4402
- FMA: 49605

The occipital branches of occipital artery are terminal branches of the occipital artery which supply the back of the head.
