= Rounded shoulder posture =

Human postural problem

Rounded shoulder posture (RSP), also known as “mom posture”, is a common postural problem in which the resting position of the shoulders leans forward from the body’s ideal alignment. Patients usually feel slouched and hunched, with the situation deteriorating if left untreated. A 1992 study concluded that 73% of workers aged 20 to 50 years have a right rounded shoulder, and 66% of them have a left rounded shoulder. It is commonly believed that digitalisation combined with the improper use of digital devices have resulted in the prevalence of sedentary lifestyles, which contribute to bad posture. Symptoms of RSP will lead to upper back stiffness, neck stiffness and shoulder stiffness. It can be diagnosed by several tests, including physical tests and imaging tests. To prevent RSP from worsening, maintaining a proper posture, doing regular exercise, and undergoing therapeutic treatments could be effective. If the situation worsens, patients should seek help from medical practitioners for treatments. If RSP is left untreated, chronic pain, reduction in lung capacity and worsened psychosocial health are likely to result.

== Causes ==
=== Poor posture ===
Poor posture can cause rounded shoulders because of the muscle imbalance and uneven weight distribution in our upper body. Long periods of time spent in positions that put undue strain on the shoulders and neck may wear out some of the muscles while weakening others. For instance, if an individual spends a long period of time in sitting positions without stretching, the chest and front arm muscles shorten and tighten, whereas the upper back and neck muscles weaken and lengthen. Due to this asymmetry, the shoulders may roll forward and the upper back may be rounded.

=== Genetics ===
The development of RSP is often influenced by genetics, as certain inherited traits could possibly have an impact on bone structure, muscular strength, and connective tissue elasticity. For instance, some people naturally have a rounded upper back because of the way their spinal vertebrae are arranged. Others may naturally have muscles in their upper back and neck that are weaker and more prone to stretching, as well as with chest and front shoulder muscles that are more resistant to stretching. Connective tissue disorders, such as Ehlers–Danlos syndrome, could also alter the strength and elasticity of ligaments and tendons. The risk of joint hypermobility and instability will be increased.

=== Psychological stressors ===
When the brain detects a threat, whether it is physical or psychological, the body will prepare itself to react against the threat (also known as the “fight or flight response”). Common responses include tensing one’s jaw, contracting the abdominal muscles, holding one’s breath and hunching one’s shoulders. Persistent psychological stressors such as career dissatisfaction, financial difficulties, or family problems may cause physical changes in the body like rounded shoulders, tension headaches and muscle tension.

=== Medical conditions ===
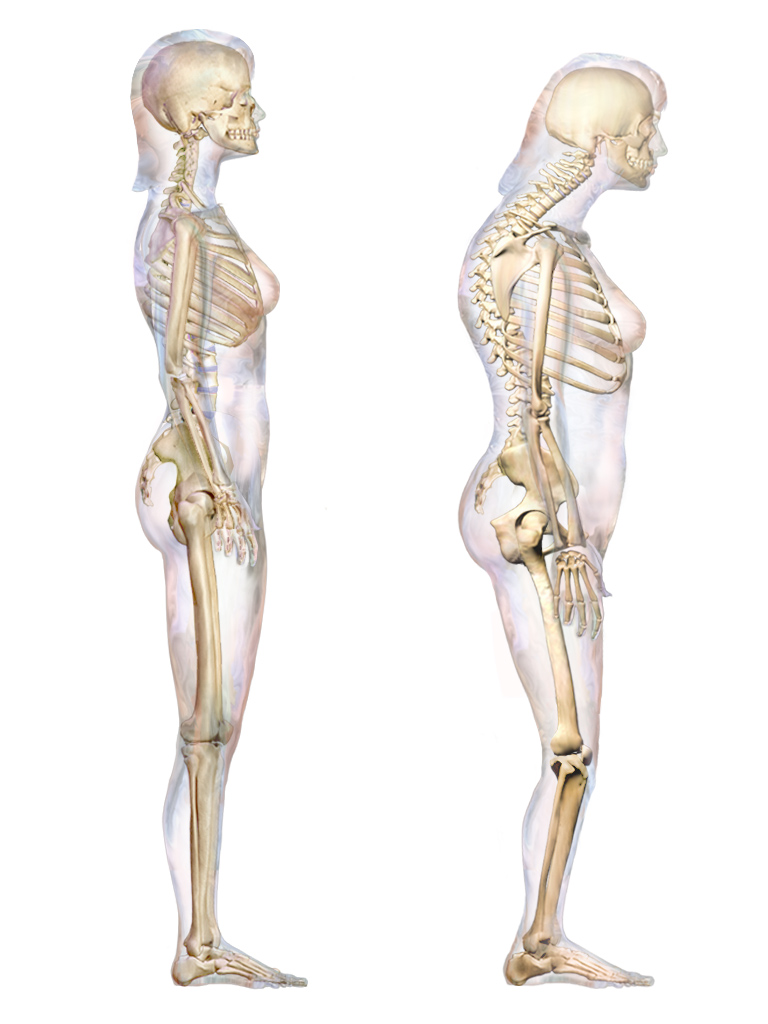
Normal person [left] vs Kyphosis patient [right]

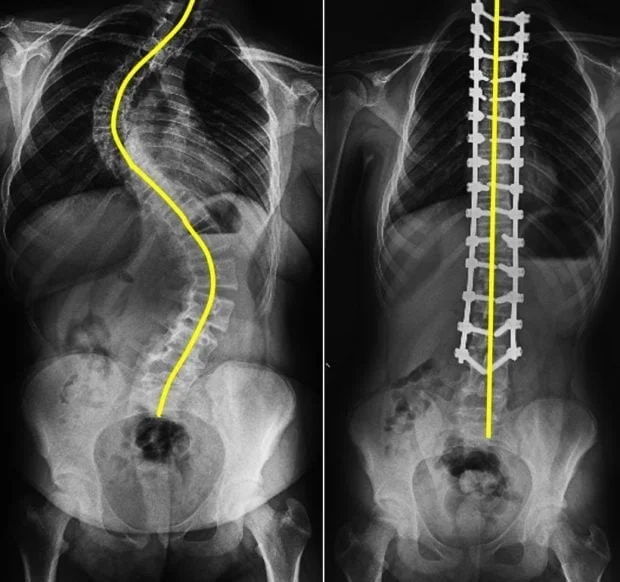
Scoliosis [left] vs Normal [right]

RSP could be a symptom of some medical conditions, such as kyphosis, scoliosis, forwarded head posture or ankylosing spondylitis. Kyphosis is a spinal disorder that contributes to excessive curvature of the upper back, leading to a hunched posture and RSP. Scoliosis refers to a condition where there is a sideways curve in a person's spine, causing our shoulders to become uneven and rounded.

== Symptoms ==
Symptoms of RSP include forward head posture, chronic shoulder and neck pain, as well as reduced mobility and flexibility in the shoulder; hindering the ability to perform daily activities.

== Diagnosis ==
The diagnosis of rounded shoulders involves a physical examination. Healthcare professionals will assess the patient’s posture, range of motion and strength during the examination. The following tests may be carried out:

=== Posture assessment ===
Patients are instructed to stand normally with their hands by their sides. Their coracoid process (CP), sternal notch (SN), posterolateral angle of acromion (PLA), and adjacent thoracic vertebral spine (TS) are found and marked. The distance between the CP and SN, and the distance between the PLA and TS are measured with tape to calculate scapular index using the formula (CP to SN)/(PLA to TS) *100.

=== Range of motion assessment ===
The ability of the patient to move their shoulders and upper back through their complete range of motion will be assessed by the medical professionals to check if there are any restrictions or limitations.

=== Muscle strength testing ===
Muscle strength testing are also utilised to evaluate RSP. The following tests can assess the strength of muscles:

==== Shoulder external rotation test ====
With this test, the strength of external rotators of the shoulders are examined, including the infraspinatus and teres minor muscles. Patients are instructed to keep their forearms bent at right angles while holding their arms at their sides. Resistance will be applied on patients while the patient rotates their shoulders.

==== Scapular retraction test ====
The middle and lower trapezius, which are responsible for retracting the scapula, are evaluated in this test. Patients are instructed to pose with their arms at the sides. Resistance is applied as the patients try to pinch their shoulder blades together.

==== Shoulder abduction test ====
Deltoid muscle strength is measured by this test. Patients are instructed to lift the arm away from the body. Resistance is applied when the patients attempt to raise the arm during the test.

=== Palpation ===
The examiner will feel the patient’s upper back and neck muscles with their hands to check the tightness, tension or abnormalities of muscles.

=== Imaging tests ===
Imaging tests such as X-rays, CT scans and MRI scans are used to determine the cause and extent of RSP.

The examiner will be able to identify areas of weakness, and provide patients with a targeted exercise regime for treatment to improve RSP.

== Treatment ==
=== General ===
Although the cause of RSP is multifactorial, two major contributors to RSP are the tightness of the pectoralis minor muscle and the weakening of lower trapezius muscle. As the only scapulothoracic muscle anteriorly originating and inserting to the scapula, the pectoralis minor’s function in favoring the internal and downward rotation of the scapula has been clinically established. Muscle strength deficits in the lower trapezius muscles are also a common clinical finding in patients with rounded shoulders as it has been speculated to restrict zygapophyseal extension in the middle to lower thoracic spine. Therefore, RSP treatment often targets the symptoms or root causes associated with these problem areas.

=== Physical therapy / exercise and stretching ===
A randomized, blinded and controlled experimental study concluded that physical therapy treatment targeting the pectoralis minor soft tissue combined with self-stretching significantly improved rounded shoulder posture. Commonly applied regimens include the McKenzie exercise– a self therapy exercise consisting of repetitive motions such as mobilization and manipulation to aid posture correction; and the Kendall exercise for strengthening the deep cervical flexor and pectoral muscle to correct neck alignment.

=== Other therapeutic treatments ===
Chiropractic adjustments, decompression therapy as well as therapeutic massages have also been known to unlock tight shoulders by strengthening the chest muscles. By applying controlled forces to spinal joints, creating space between vertebrae and kneading soft tissues of the body respectively; these therapeutic treatments address core sources of rounded shoulders and restore musculoskeletal imbalances by realigning the spine and shoulders.

== Prevention ==
The prevalence of rounded shoulders is often linked to modern lifestyles, such as spending long hours sitting in front of a computer or hunching over a mobile device.

=== Proper posture ===
One of the most direct preventive measure for rounded shoulders is consistently maintaining a good posture. Sitting up straight and engaging the core muscles to keep the shoulders back and down can help maintain proper alignment and prevent the shoulders from rounding forward. Additionally, stretching the chest muscles and strengthening the back muscles can also help improve posture. Exercises that strengthen the back muscles include rows, pull-ups, and shoulder blade squeezes. Exercises like doorway stretches for the chest can help stretch out tension that contributes to rounded shoulders. Synergistically implementing muscle strengthening and stretching can effectively prevent the development of rounded shoulders.

=== Regular exercise ===
Rounded shoulders can also be prevented by taking frequent breaks from prolonged sitting to engage in regular physical activity. Activities that require arm and shoulder motion, such as swimming, walking, and other sports, can help to strengthen and stretch the associated muscles, improving posture and reducing the likelihood of developing rounded shoulders.

== Complications of untreated rounded shoulders ==
However, if left undiagnosed, rounded shoulders can lead to several prolonged complications. The extent of postural abnormality may result in a significantly increased incidence of pain and discomfort in the neck, shoulders, and upper back, which then possibly affects overall health and well-being.

=== Chronic pain ===
Chronic pain and discomfort brought on by the persistent tension in the muscles of the upper body may have a negative influence on everyday life. This discomfort leads to reduced agility and range of motion, making it harder to accomplish regular chores. A patient's quality of life may also be significantly impacted by unilateral cervicogenic headaches that originate in musculoskeletal tissue innervated by cervical nerves and progress to the fronto-temporal and orbital areas.

=== Reduced lung capacity ===
Lung capacity reduction is another issue associated with rounded shoulders. The chest cavity might become constrained when the shoulders are positioned forward, making it more difficult to take deep breaths due to a lowered total lung capacity. Furthermore, secondary muscles of inspiration, such as the serratus anterior, sternocleidomastoid, and pectoralis minor, become weak as a result of the kyphotic posture and posterior pelvic tilt that flatten the lumbar lordosis. Atypical breathing patterns then arise from the overactivation of secondary muscles of inspiration due to their weakness. This might lead to shortness of breath and exhaustion, making it increasingly difficult to participate in physical exercise.

=== Psychosocial health ===
Rounded shoulders can also affect psychosocial and mental health Depression and anxiety are two prevalent psychological side effects of chronic pain. Individuals with chronic pain may have anxiety about the future and their capacity to manage the pain, as well as depressive symptoms owing to the negative effects the pain has on their quality of life. If the pain is not being properly managed or if it is interfering with everyday tasks, these emotions can be particularly difficult to navigate. Social interactions could also be impacted by chronic pain. Patients with chronic pain could find that their discomfort makes it difficult for them to work, exercise, and socialize, which can lead to feelings of loneliness and frustration that might exacerbate the psychological issues outlined above.

=== Additional complications ===
Additional reported complications of rounded shoulders include poor balance, jaw pain, migraines and other issues.

== Seeking medical practitioners ==
RSP is an issue that should be addressed, as many serious complications, such as chronic pain, headaches, or breathing difficulties will result if left untreated. RSP may also lower one’s self-esteem and confidence because of its atypical appearance.

To prevent or correct RSP, individuals should maintain good posture when performing daily tasks, and take frequent breaks when necessary. Regular exercise is also useful in strengthening the upper back and neck muscles. Postural alignment, pain and discomfort will be reduced to improve our overall health and wellbeing.

Prolonged pain or discomfort as a result of rounded shoulders should be reported to medical practitioners. Seeking the counsel of a physician or physical therapist could help create a specific strategy for avoiding and treating the issue. Any underlying problems correlated to the patient’s lifestyle habits can be addressed by a healthcare expert, who can then suggest particular stretches and exercises to correct them.
