= Spina helicis =

Cartilaginous projection of the ear

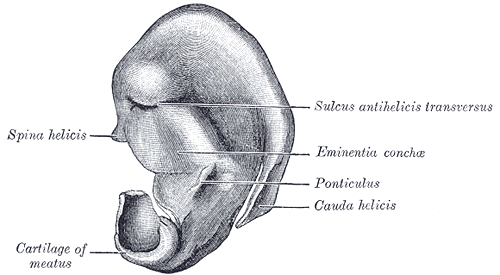
- Cranial surface of cartilage of right auricula. (Spina helicis labeled at center right.)

Identifiers
- TA98: A15.3.01.007
- TA2: 952
- FMA: 61027

At the front part of the auricula, where the helix bends upward, is a small projection of cartilage, called the spina helicis.
