= Neck pain =

- Other names: Cervicalgia
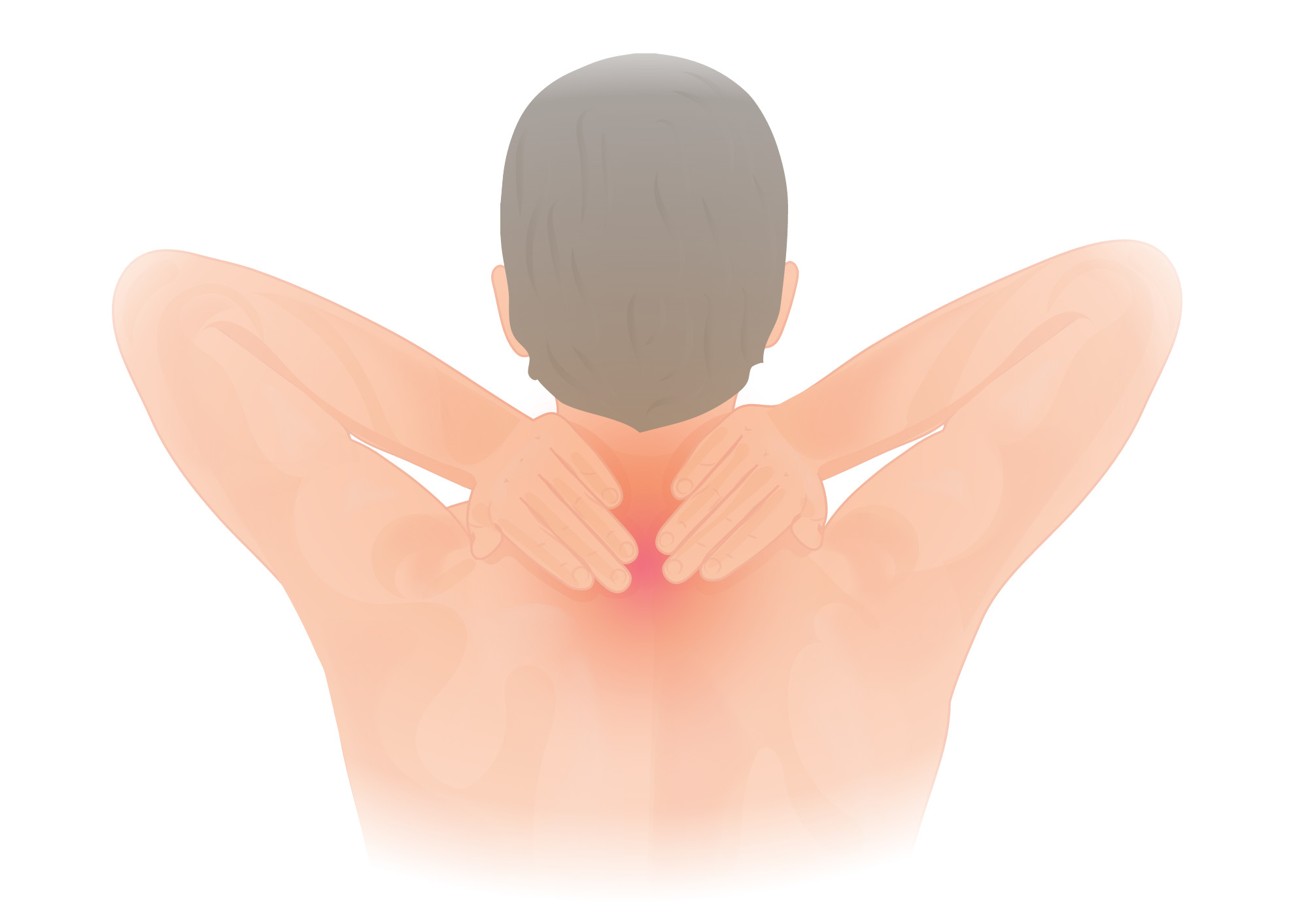
- Illustration of a person with neck pain
- Specialty: Neurosurgery

Neck pain, also known as cervicalgia, is a common problem, with two-thirds of the population having neck pain at some point in their lives.

Because there is not a universally accepted classification for neck pain, it is difficult to study the different types of pain. In 2020, neck pain was the second most common cause of disability in the United States and cost $100 billion in health care spending.

Nightly rotator cuff impingement may lead to an asymptomatic shoulder impingement, leading to neck pain. Neck pain can be caused by other spinal problems, and may arise from muscular tightness in both the neck and upper back, or pinching of the nerves emanating from the cervical vertebrae.

The head is supported by the lower neck and upper back, and it is these areas that commonly cause neck pain. If this support system is affected adversely, then the muscles in the area will tighten, leading to neck pain.

As of 2020, neck pain affected about 203 million people globally, with females having higher prevalence.

== Differential diagnosis ==
Neck pain may come from any of the structures in the neck including: vascular, nerve, airway, digestive, and musculature / skeletal, or be referred from other areas of the body.

Common and lesser neck pain causes include:

- Stress – physical and emotional stresses
- Prolonged postures – many people fall asleep on sofas and chairs and wake up with sore necks.
- Minor injuries and falls – car accidents, sporting events, and day to day injuries that are really minor.
- Referred pain – mostly from upper back problems
- Over-use – muscular strain is one of the most common causes
- Whiplash
- Pinched nerve

Major and severe causes of neck pain (roughly in order of severity) include:

- Carotid artery dissection
- Referred pain from acute coronary syndrome
- Head and neck cancer
- Infections, including:
  - Meningitis of several types including sudden onset of severe neck or back pain particularly in teens and young adults which may be fatal if not treated quickly
  - Retropharyngeal abscess
  - Epiglottitis
- Spinal disc herniation – protruding or bulging discs, or if severe prolapse.
- Spondylosis – degenerative arthritis and osteophytes
- Spinal stenosis – a narrowing of the spinal canal

Although the causes are numerous, most are easily rectified by either professional help or using self help advice and techniques.

More causes can include: poor sleeping posture, torticollis, head injury, motor vehicle accidents, rheumatoid arthritis, Carotidynia, congenital cervical rib, mononucleosis, rubella, certain cancers, ankylosing spondylitis, cervical spine fracture, esophageal trauma, subarachnoid hemorrhage, lymphadenitis, thyroid trauma, and tracheal trauma.

== Treatment ==
Treatment of neck pain depends on the cause. For the vast majority of people, neck pain can be treated conservatively.

Recommendations in which it helps alleviate symptoms include applying heat or cold. Other common treatments could include medication, body mechanics training, ergonomic reform, and physical therapy. Treatments may also include patient education, but existing evidence shows a lack of effectiveness.

=== Medication ===
Analgesics such as acetaminophen or NSAIDs are generally recommended for pain. A 2017 systemic review, however found that paracetamol was not efficacious and that NSAIDs provide a marginal improvement compared to placebo, but not enough to be clinically significant. The study found the number needed to treat (NNT) for NSAIDs in patients with spinal pain was 6, meaning you would need to give 6 separate patients the medication for 1 to feel a clinically significant positive effect. The authors of this review cite the side effect profile of NSAIDs when compared to placebo as another reason that more research and better drugs are needed.

Muscle relaxants may also be recommended. However, one study showed that one muscle relaxant called cyclobenzaprine was not effective for treatment of acute cervical strain (as opposed to neck pain from other etiologies or chronic neck pain).

=== Surgery ===
Surgery is usually not indicated for mechanical causes of neck pain. If neck pain is the result of instability, cancer, or other disease, surgery may be necessary. Surgery is usually not indicated for "pinched nerves" or herniated discs unless there is spinal cord compression or pain and disability have been protracted for many months and refractory to conservative treatment such as physical therapy.

=== Alternative medicine ===
Exercise plus joint manipulation has been found to be beneficial in both acute and chronic mechanical neck disorders. In particular, specific strengthening exercise may improve function and pain. Motor control using cranio-cervical flexion exercises has been shown to be effective for non-specific chronic neck pain. Both cervical manipulation and cervical mobilization produce similar immediate-, and short-term changes. Multiple cervical manipulation sessions may provide better pain relief and functional improvement than certain medications at immediate to long-term follow-up. Thoracic manipulation may also improve pain and function.

Low-level laser therapy has been shown to reduce pain immediately after treatment in acute neck pain and up to 22 weeks after completion of treatment in patients that experience chronic neck pain. Low quality evidence suggests that cognitive-behavioural therapy may be effective at reducing pain in the short-term. Massaging the area may provide immediate and short-lived benefits, but long term effects are unknown. There is a lack of high-quality evidence to support the use of mechanical traction, and side effects include headaches, nausea and injury to tissue. Radiofrequency denervation may provide temporary relief for specific affected areas in the neck. Transcutaneous electrical nerve stimulation (TENS), the noninvasive use of electrical stimulation on the skin, is of unclear benefit in chronic neck pain.

== Epidemiology ==
Neck pain affects about 330 million people globally as of 2010 (4.9% of the population). It is more common in women (5.7%) than men (3.9%).It is less common than low back pain.

== Prognosis ==
About one-half of episodes resolve within one year, and approximately 10% become chronic.

== Prevention ==
Prevalence of neck pain in the population suggests it is a common condition. For cervicalgia associated with bad posture the treatment is usually corrective in nature (i.e. ensure shoulders are in one line above the hips) and relating to interventions that provide ergonomic improvement. There is also growing research in how neck pain caused by mobile devices (see iHunch) can be prevented using embedded warning systems.
