= Sternocleidomastoid branches of occipital artery =

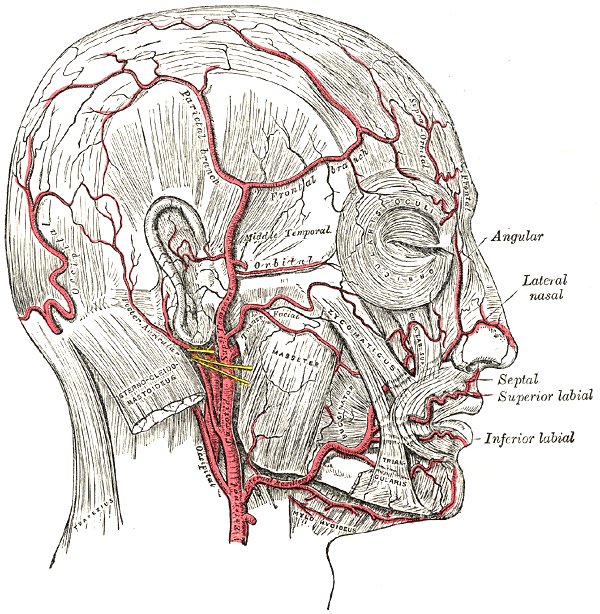
- The arteries of the face and scalp.

Details
- Source: Occipital artery

Identifiers
- Latin: rami sternocleidomastoidei arteriae occipitalis
- TA98: A12.2.05.033
- TA2: 4401
- FMA: 49590

The two sternocleidomastoid branches of the occipital artery (sternocleidomastoid artery) arise directly from the occipital artery and are the initial two branches of this artery. Uncommonly, the lower sternocleidomastoid branch can branch directly from the external carotid.

The lower sternocleidomastoid branch passes infero-external to the hypoglossal nerve before descending into the substance of the muscle to which its name is derived. The upper sternocleidomastoid branch diverts from the main trunk at the deep border of the proximal end of the posterior digastric muscle belly, coursing with the spinal accessory nerve prior to arborising into the sternocleidomastoid.
