= Splenius cervicis muscle =

Muscle in the back of the neck

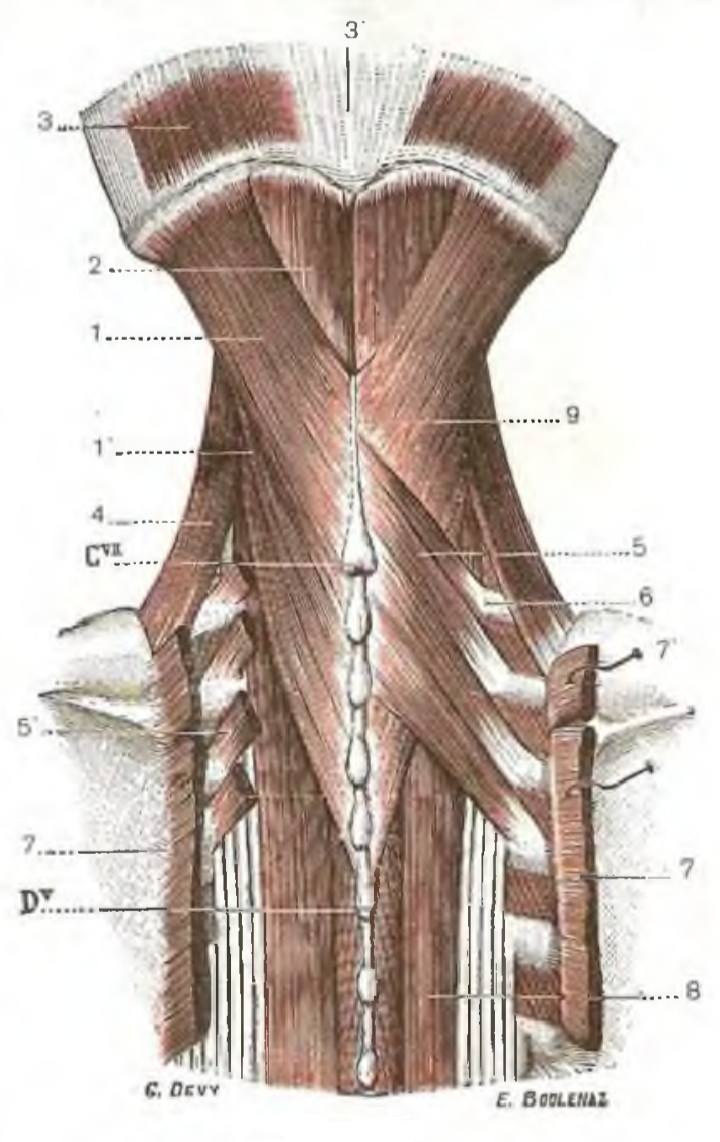
- Deep, posterior muscles of the neck. Right-sided splenius cervicis (not labeled) is partially concealed by serratus posterior superior (labeled 5). Left-sided splenius cervicis is labeled 1'. (After Testut's Anatomy.)

Details
- Origin: Spinous processes of T3-T6
- Insertion: Transverse processes of C1-C3
- Artery: Transverse cervical artery and occipital artery
- Nerve: Posterior rami of the lower Cervical spinal nerves
- Actions: Bilaterally: Extend the head and neck, Unilaterally: Lateral flexion to the same side, Rotation to the same side.

Identifiers
- Latin: musculus splenius cervicis
- TA98: A04.3.02.104
- TA2: 2274
- FMA: 22681

The splenius cervicis (/ˈspliːniəs sərˈvaɪsɪs/) (also known as the splenius colli, /- ˈkɒlaɪ/) is a muscle in the back of the neck. It arises by a narrow tendinous band from the spinous processes of the third, fourth, and fifth thoracic vertebrae; it is inserted, by tendinous fasciculi, into the posterior tubercles of the transverse processes of the upper three cervical vertebrae.

Its name is based on the Greek word σπληνίον, splenion (meaning a bandage) and the Latin word cervix (meaning a neck). The word collum also refers to the neck in Latin.

The function of the splenius cervicis muscle is extension of the cervical spine, rotation to the ipsilateral side and lateral flexion to the ipsilateral side.

== Additional images ==
Position of splenius cervicis muscle (shown in red).

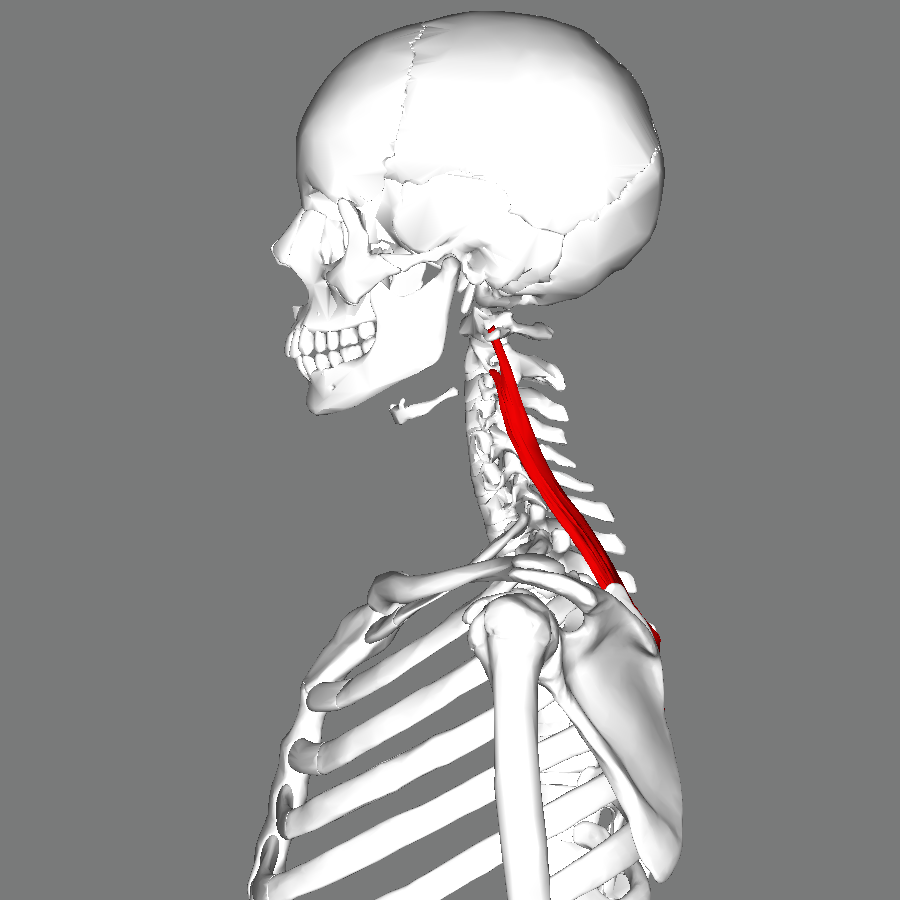
Lateral view.

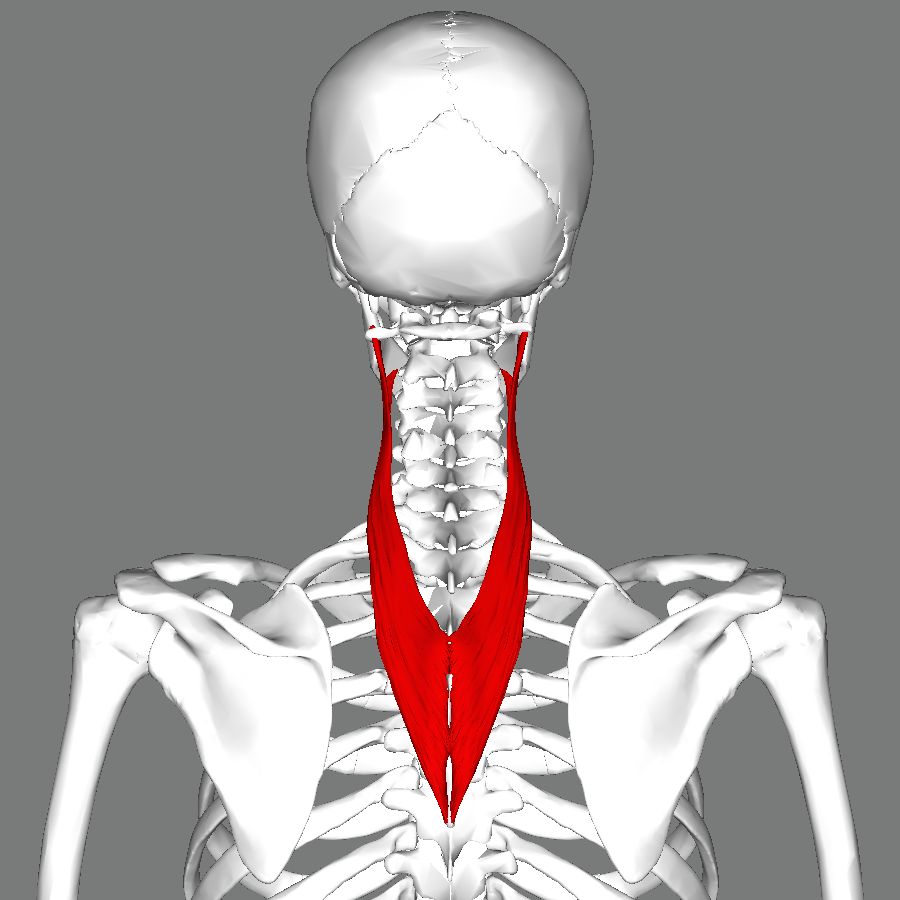
Posterior view.

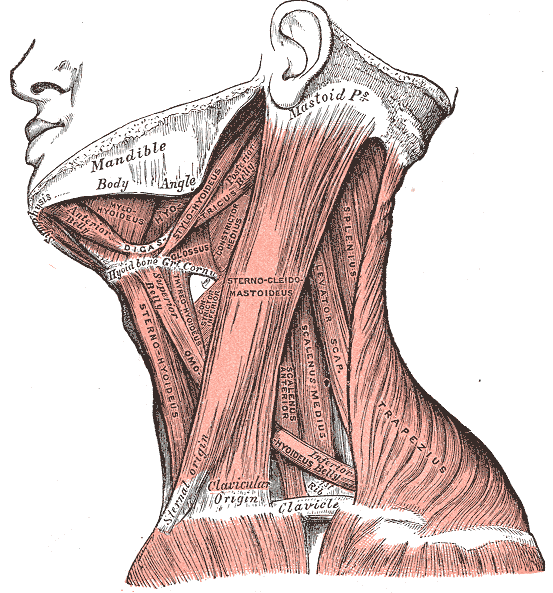
Muscles of the neck. Lateral view.

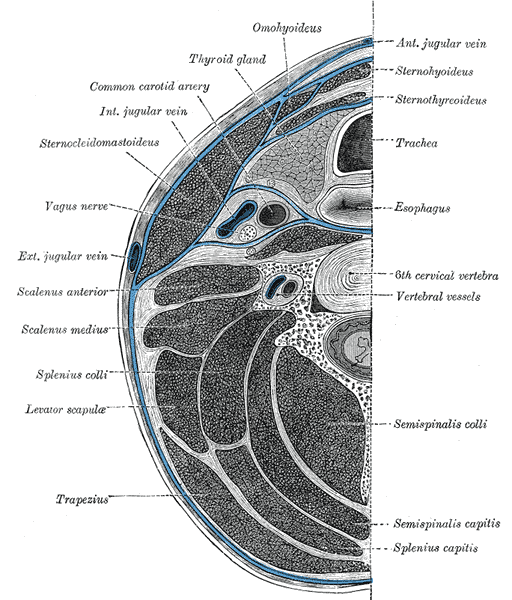
Section of the neck at the level of the sixth cervical vertebra.

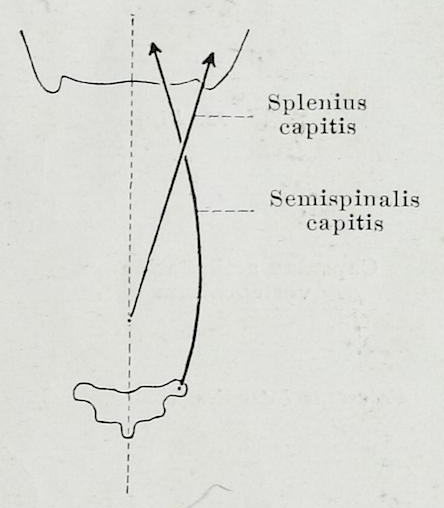
Splenius and Semispinalis

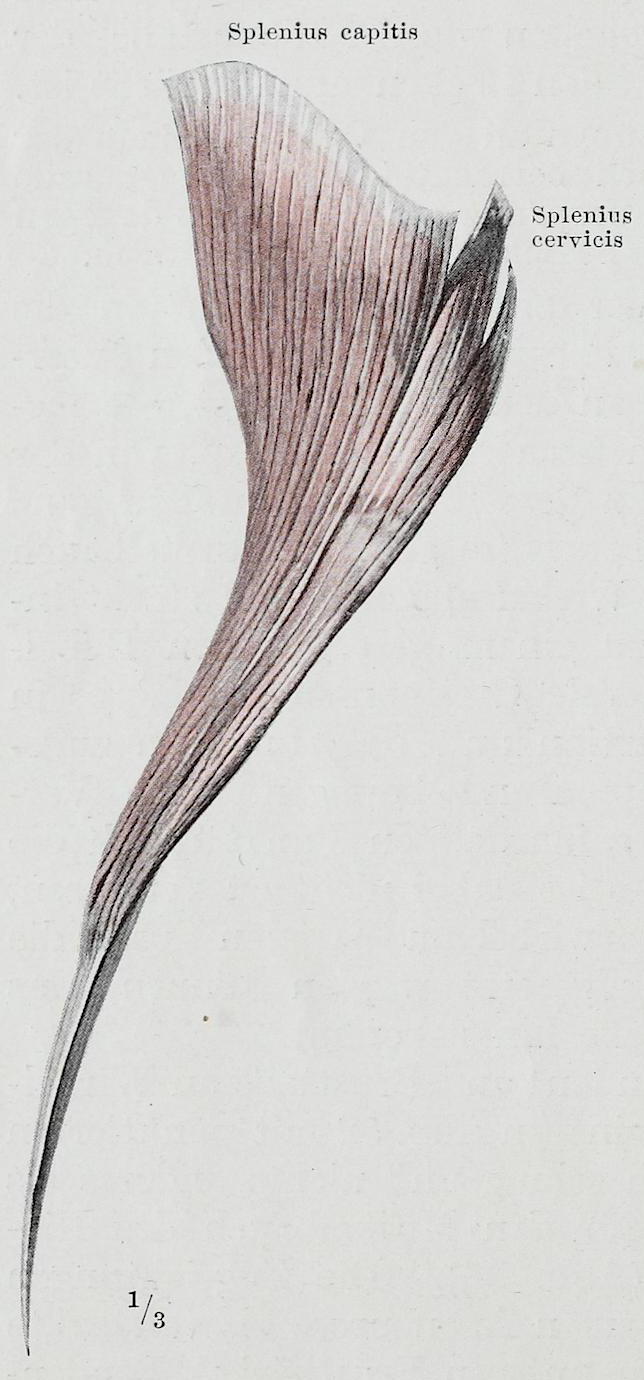
Splenius
