= Occipital artery =

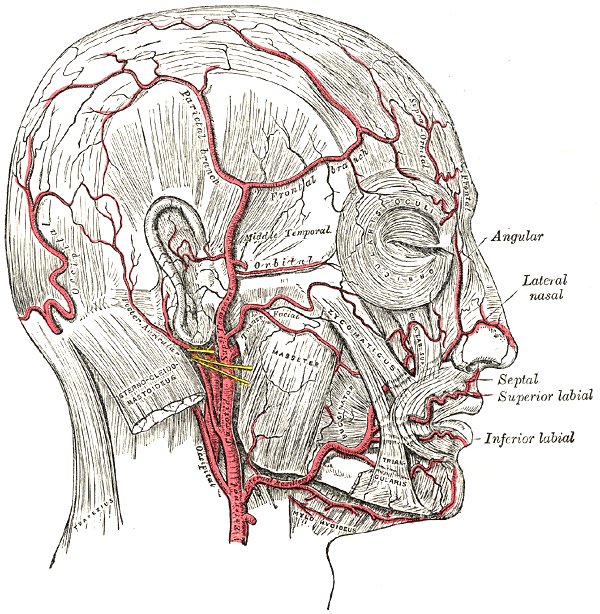
- The arteries of the face and scalp. (Occipital visible at center left.)

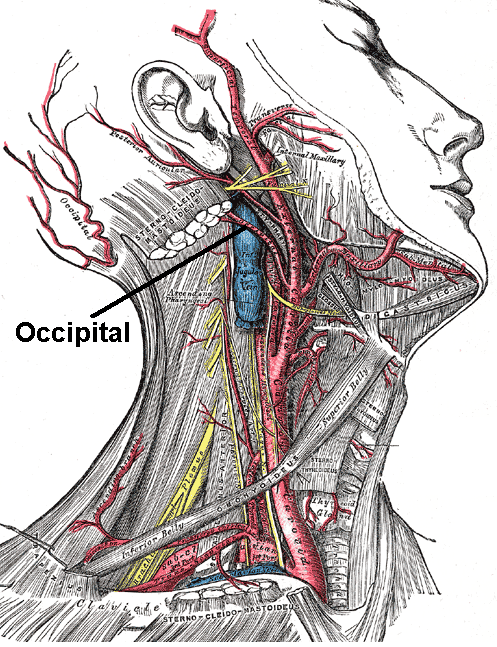
- Superficial dissection of the right side of the neck, showing the carotid and subclavian arteries.

Details
- Source: External carotid artery
- Vein: Occipital vein
- Supplies: Occiput, scalp

Identifiers
- Latin: arteria occipitalis
- TA98: A12.2.05.030
- TA2: 4398
- FMA: 49586

The occipital artery is a branch of the external carotid artery that provides arterial supply to the back of the scalp, sternocleidomastoid muscles, and deep muscles of the back and neck.

== Structure ==
=== Origin ===
The occipital artery arises from (the posterior aspect of) the external carotid artery (some 2 cm distal to the origin of the external carotid artery).

=== Course and relations ===
At its origin, the hypoglossal nerve (CN XII) crosses artery superficially as the nerve passes posteroanteriorly.

The artery passes superoposteriorly deep to the posterior belly of the digastricus muscle. It crosses the internal carotid artery and vein, the vagus nerve (CN X), accessory nerve (CN XI), and hypoglossal nerve (CN XII).

It next ascends to the interval between the transverse process of the atlas and the mastoid process of the temporal bone, and passes horizontally backward, grooving the surface of the latter bone, being covered by the sternocleidomastoideus, splenius capitis, longissimus capitis, and digastricus, and resting upon the rectus capitis lateralis, the obliquus capitis superior, and semispinalis capitis.

It then changes its course and runs vertically upward, pierces the fascia connecting the cranial attachment of the trapezius with the sternocleidomastoideus, and ascends in a tortuous course in the superficial fascia of the scalp, where it divides into numerous branches, which reach as high as the vertex of the skull and anastomose with the posterior auricular and superficial temporal arteries.

=== Distribution ===
1. Muscular branches: supply the digastric, stylohyoid, splenius, and longus capitis muscles.
2. Sternocleidomastoid branch: This branch divides into upper and lower branches in the carotid triangle. The upper branch accompanies the accessory nerve to the sternocleidomastoid, and the lower branch arises near the origin of the occipital artery before entering the sternocleidomastoid muscle. Occasionally, this branch arises directly from the external carotid artery.
3. Auricular branch: supplies the back of the ear. In many specimens, this branch gives rise to the mastoid branch, which supplies the dura mater, diploe, and mastoid air cells. In other specimens, the mastoid artery is a branch of the occipital artery, rather than the auricular branch.
4. Meningeal branch: supplies the dura mater in the posterior cranial fossa
5. Descending branches: This is the largest branch. It descends on the posterior aspect of the neck, and divides into a superficial and deep portion. The superficial portion supplies the trapezius muscle and anastomoses with the ascending branch of the transverse cervical. The deep portion anastomoses with the vertebral artery and with the a. profunda cervicalis, a branch of the costocervical trunk. Thus, branches of the occipital artery participate in anastomosis between the external carotid and the subclavian artery, thereby providing collateral circulation.

Its terminal portion is accompanied by the greater occipital nerve.

== Additional images ==
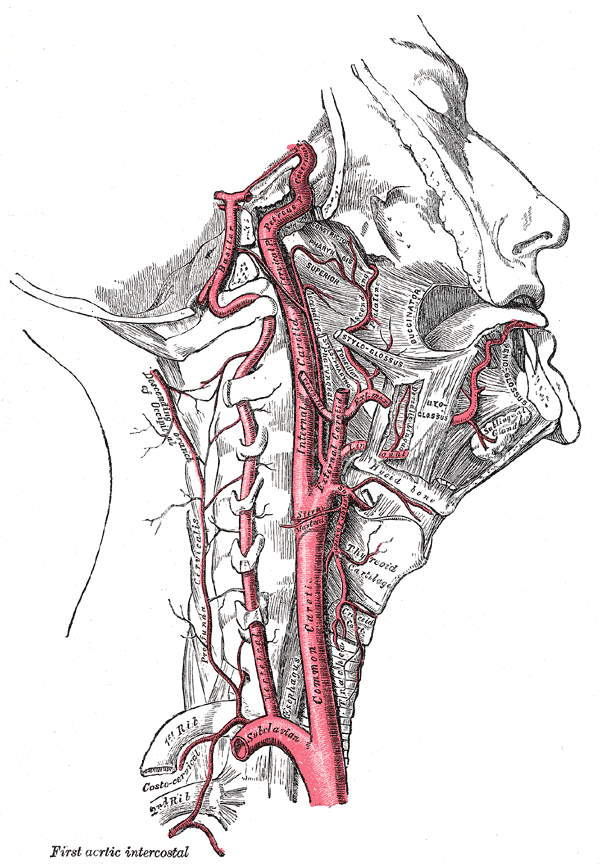
The internal carotid and vertebral arteries. Right side.

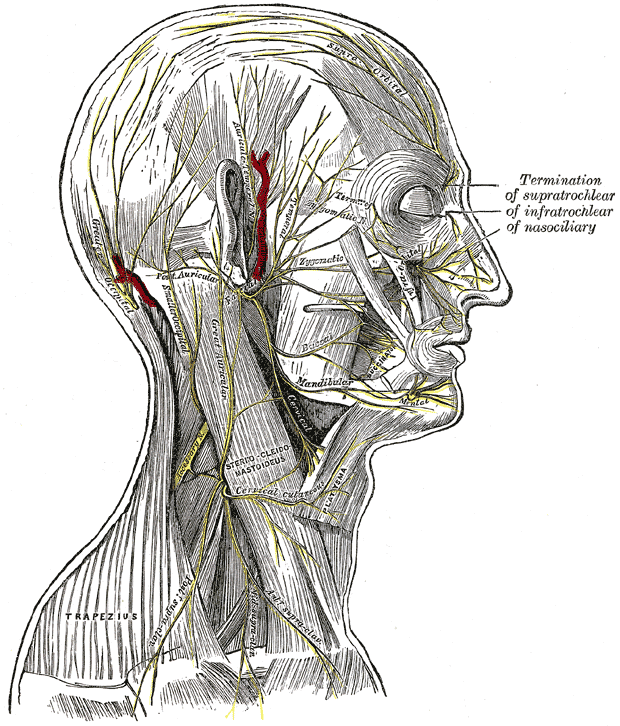
The nerves of the scalp, face, and side of neck.

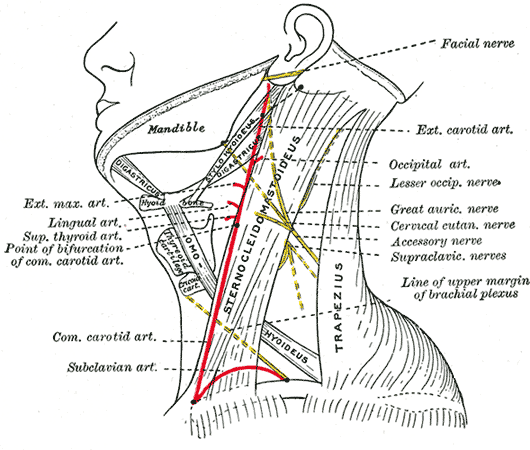
Side of neck, showing chief surface markings.

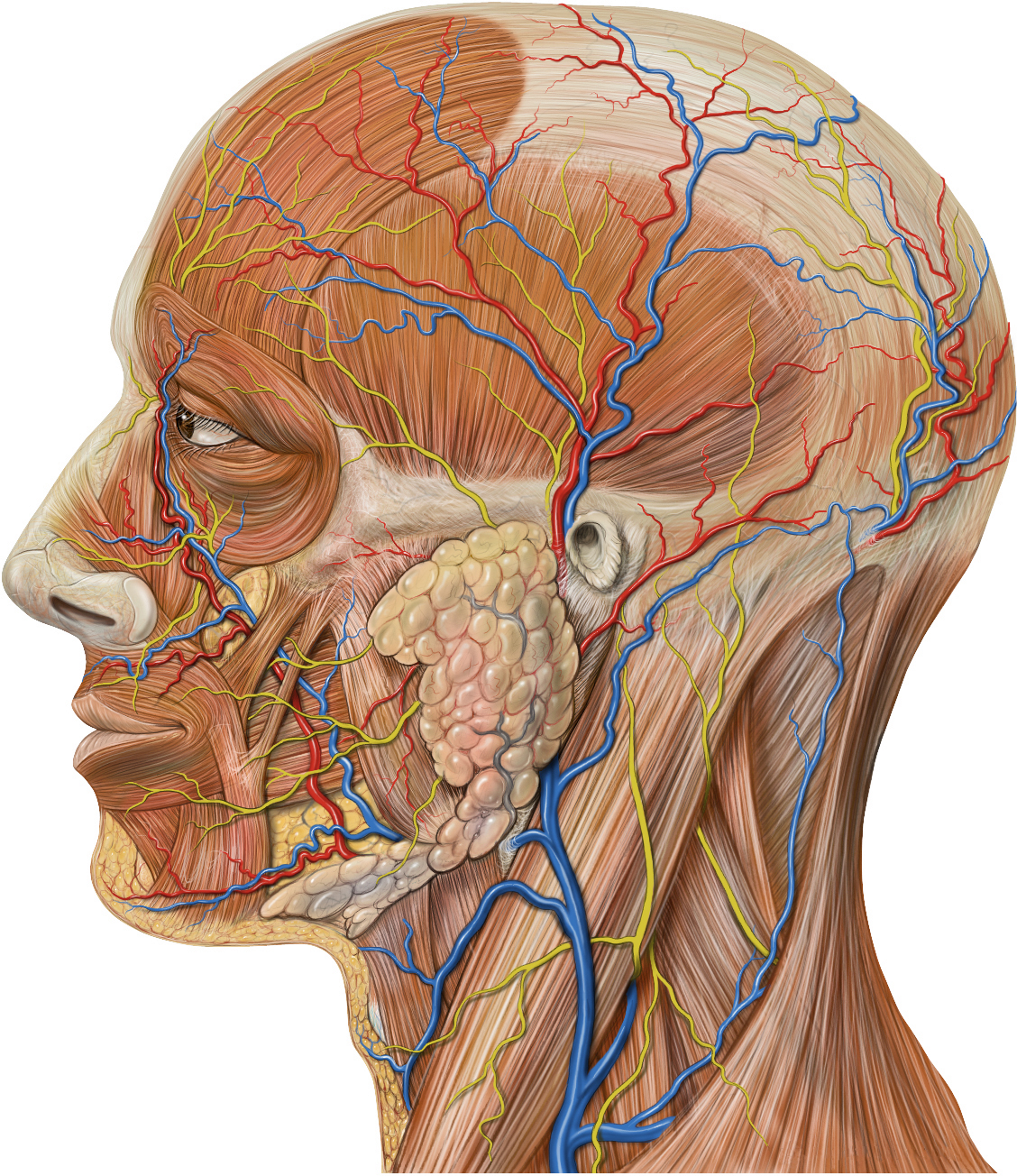
Lateral head anatomy detail
