= Splenius capitis muscle =

Broad, straplike muscle in the back of the neck

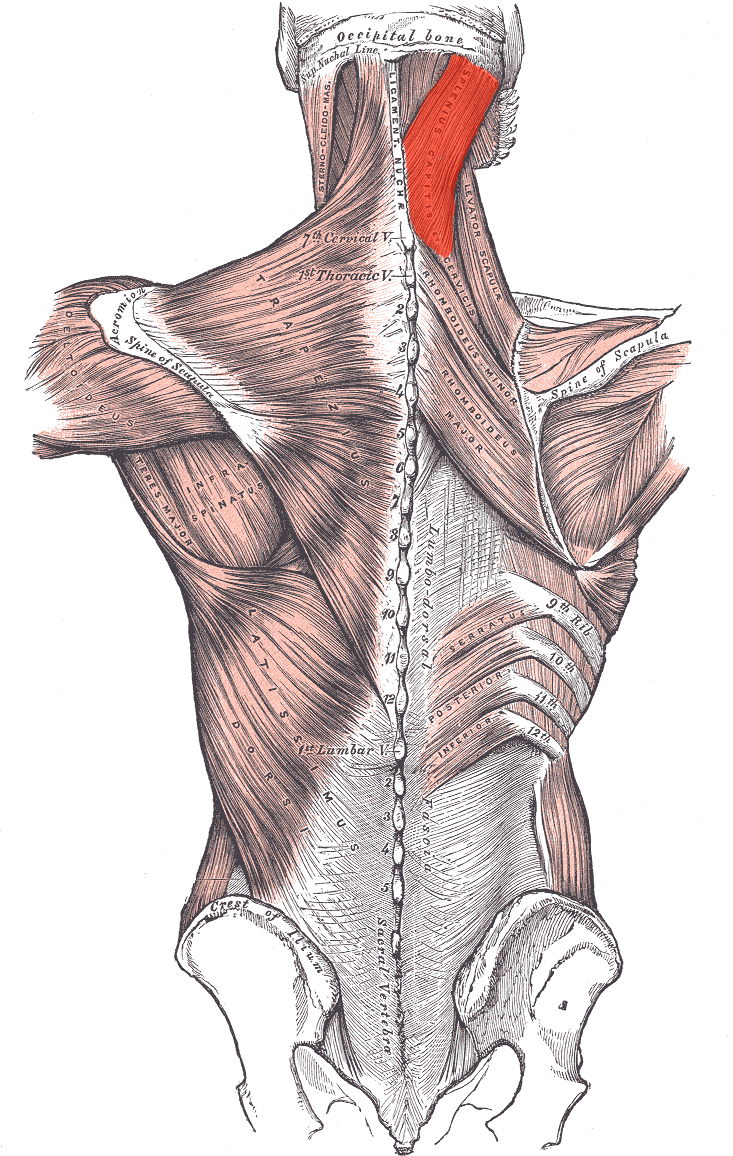
- Muscles connecting the upper extremity to the vertebral column (splenius capitis et cervicis labeled at upper right).

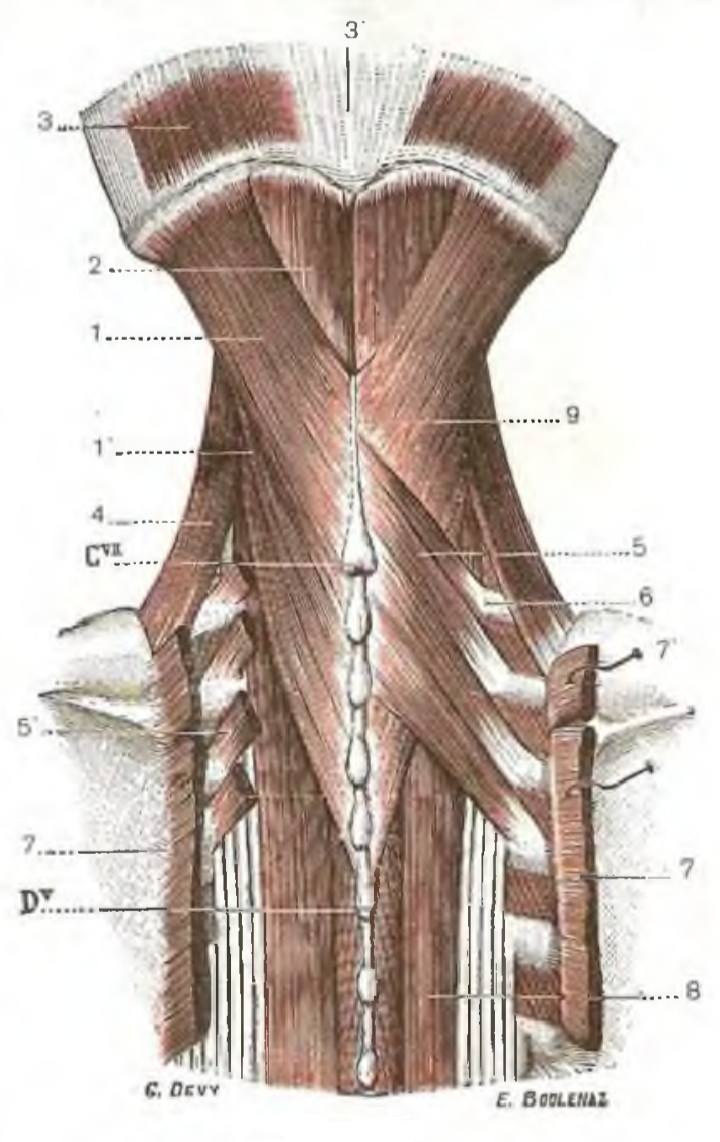
- Deep, posterior muscles of the neck. Left-sided splenius capitis is labeled 1. Left-sided splenius cervicis is labeled 1'. Nuchal ligament is labeled 9. (After Testut's Anatomy.)

Details
- Origin: Nuchal ligament and spinous process of C7-T3
- Insertion: Mastoid process of temporal and occipital bone
- Artery: Muscular branches of the aorta
- Nerve: Posterior ramus of spinal nerves C3 and C4
- Actions: Extend, rotate, and laterally flex the head

Identifiers
- Latin: musculus splenius capitis
- TA98: A04.3.02.103
- TA2: 2273
- FMA: 22653

The splenius capitis (/ˈspliːniəs ˈkæpɪtɪs/) (from Greek splēníon 'bandage' and Latin caput 'head') is a broad, straplike muscle in the back of the neck. It pulls on the base of the skull from the vertebrae in the neck and upper thorax. It is involved in movements such as shaking the head.

== Structure ==
It arises from the lower half of the nuchal ligament, from the spinous process of the seventh cervical vertebra, and from the spinous processes of the upper two thoracic vertebrae.

The fibers of the muscle are directed upward and laterally and are inserted, under cover of the sternocleidomastoideus, into the mastoid process of the temporal bone, and into the rough surface on the occipital bone just below the lateral third of the superior nuchal line. The splenius capitis is deep to sternocleidomastoideus at the mastoid process, and to the trapezius for its lower portion. It is one of the muscles that forms the floor of the posterior triangle of the neck.

The splenius capitis muscle is innervated by the posterior ramus of spinal nerves C3 and C4.

== Function ==
The splenius capitis muscle is a prime mover for head extension. The splenius capitis can also allow lateral flexion and rotation of the cervical spine.

== Additional images ==
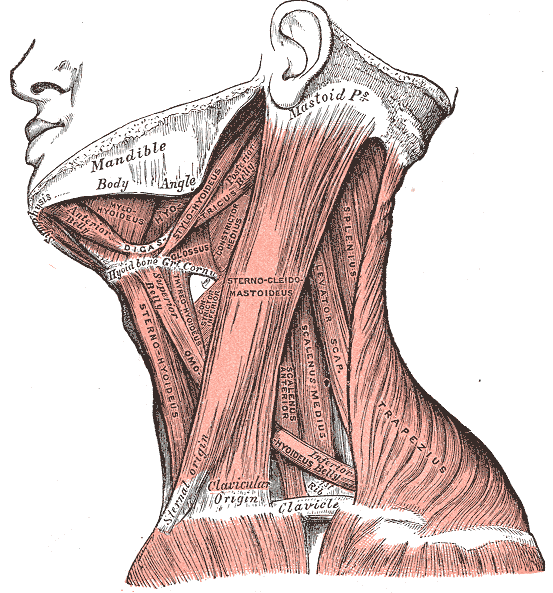
Muscles of the neck. Lateral view.

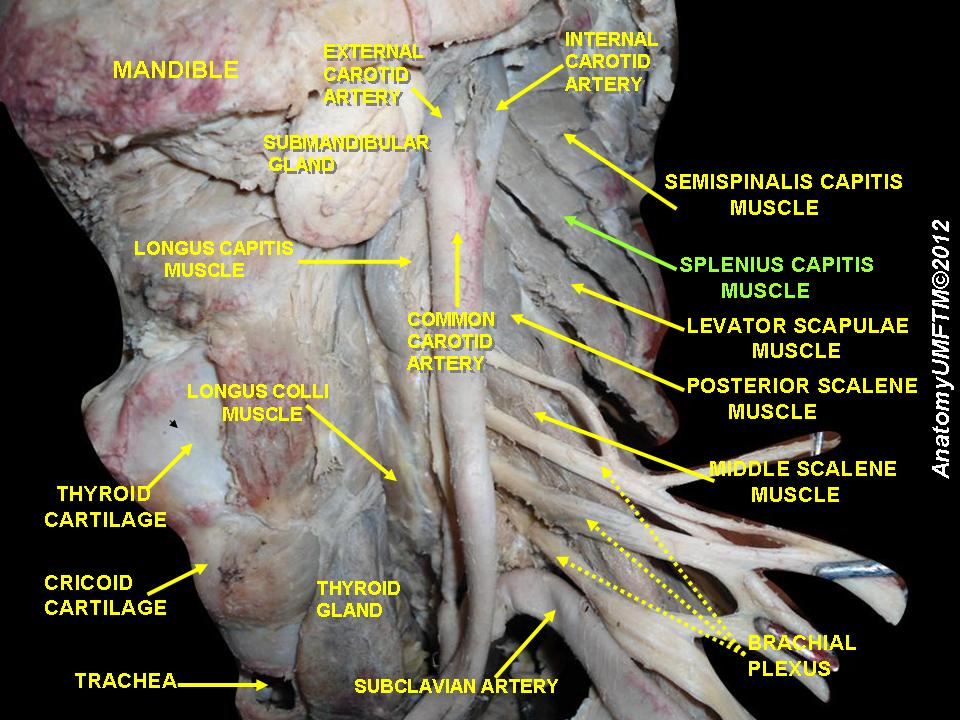
Splenius capitis muscle

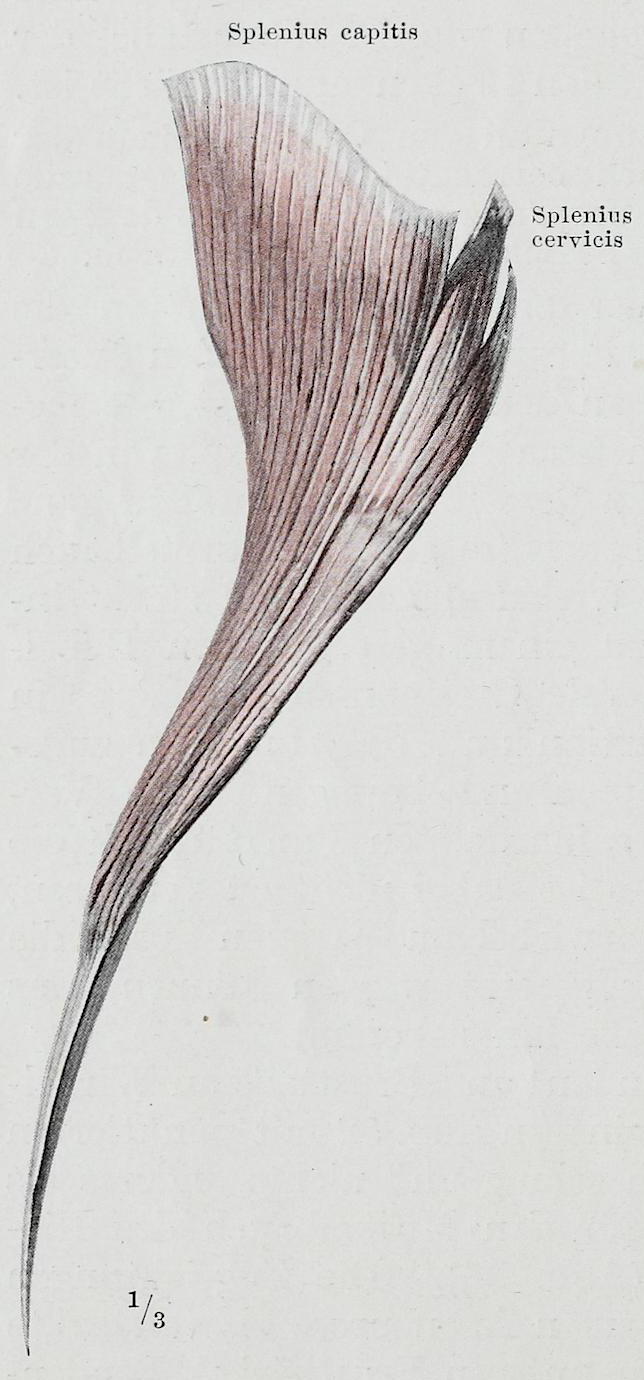
Splenius muscle

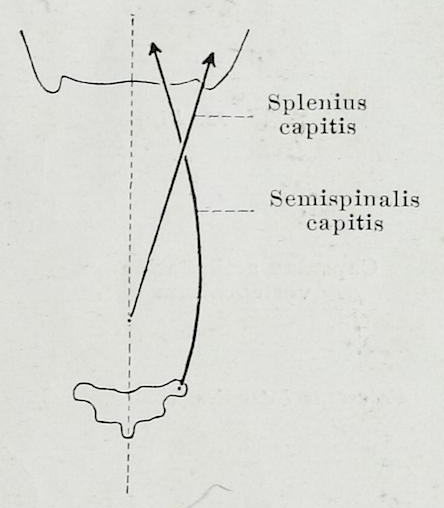
Splenius and Semispinalis

== See also ==
- Splenius cervicis muscle
