= Cold water flat =

Apartment that has no running hot water

A cold water flat is an apartment that has no running hot water.

In most developed countries, current building codes make cold water flats illegal, but they used to be common in such cities as Detroit, Chicago and New York City until the mid-twentieth century. The Chicago City Council banned such flats and passed an ordinance requiring hot water piping and water heating apparatuses for all residential units in January 1957, setting the deadline for enforcement to January 1, 1962.

Typically, cold water flats did not have built-in showers installed; tenants who wished to bathe would heat pots of water by stove and add the heated water to a bathtub, or take a sponge bath. They also typically had no central heating. Often some type of cooking stove, either wood or coal, was the only heat source and was kept going most of the time. Wood or coal embers could be banked in the small stoves overnight so a fire could be easily started early in the morning. A gas cooking surface was often just a grate with jets. Tenants would also keep warm by use of kerosene or electric space heaters, hot water bottles, or much later, electric blankets.

== See also ==
- District heating
