= Hybrid shipping container =

A hybrid shipping container is a temperature-controlled shipping container that combines elements of passive and active thermal protection systems. Hybrid shipping containers commonly use phase-change material (PCM) and thermal energy storage units, sometimes referred to as a cold-energy battery, together with insulation and monitoring technologies to maintain temperature-sensitive products within specified ranges during transport.

== Application ==
One of the primary applications of hybrid containers is in pharmaceutical cold-chain logistics to keep pharmaceutical products, such as vaccines or active ingredients, within strict temperature ranges. Currently, this technology is only being used in a limited number of shipping containers.

Examples of hybrid shipping container systems include SkyCell 1500X, SkyCell 6500X, va-Q-tec va-Q-one, and Tower Cold Chain KTEvolution. Other temperature-controlled container providers, including Peli BioThermal and World Courier, offer solutions incorporating thermal energy storage and advanced insulation technologies.

== Technology ==
A cold-energy battery works by storing energy to a given temperature and using its thermal mass to maintain this temperature. It can be recharged by being placed in a temperature range applicable to its phase change window.

Many hybrid shipping containers also incorporate temperature-monitoring systems that provide visibility into shipment conditions throughout transport.

== See also ==
- Insulated shipping container
- Intermediate bulk container
- Phase-change material
