= InfraStar bike =

Type of fitness equipment

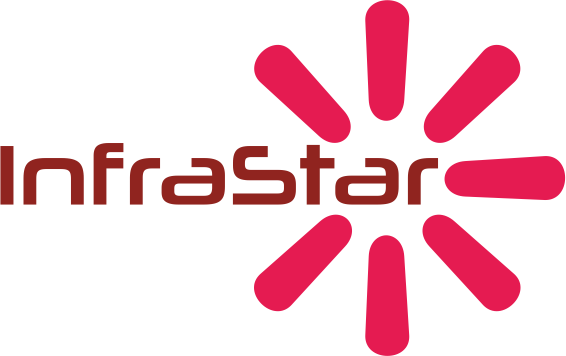
InfraStar — company logo

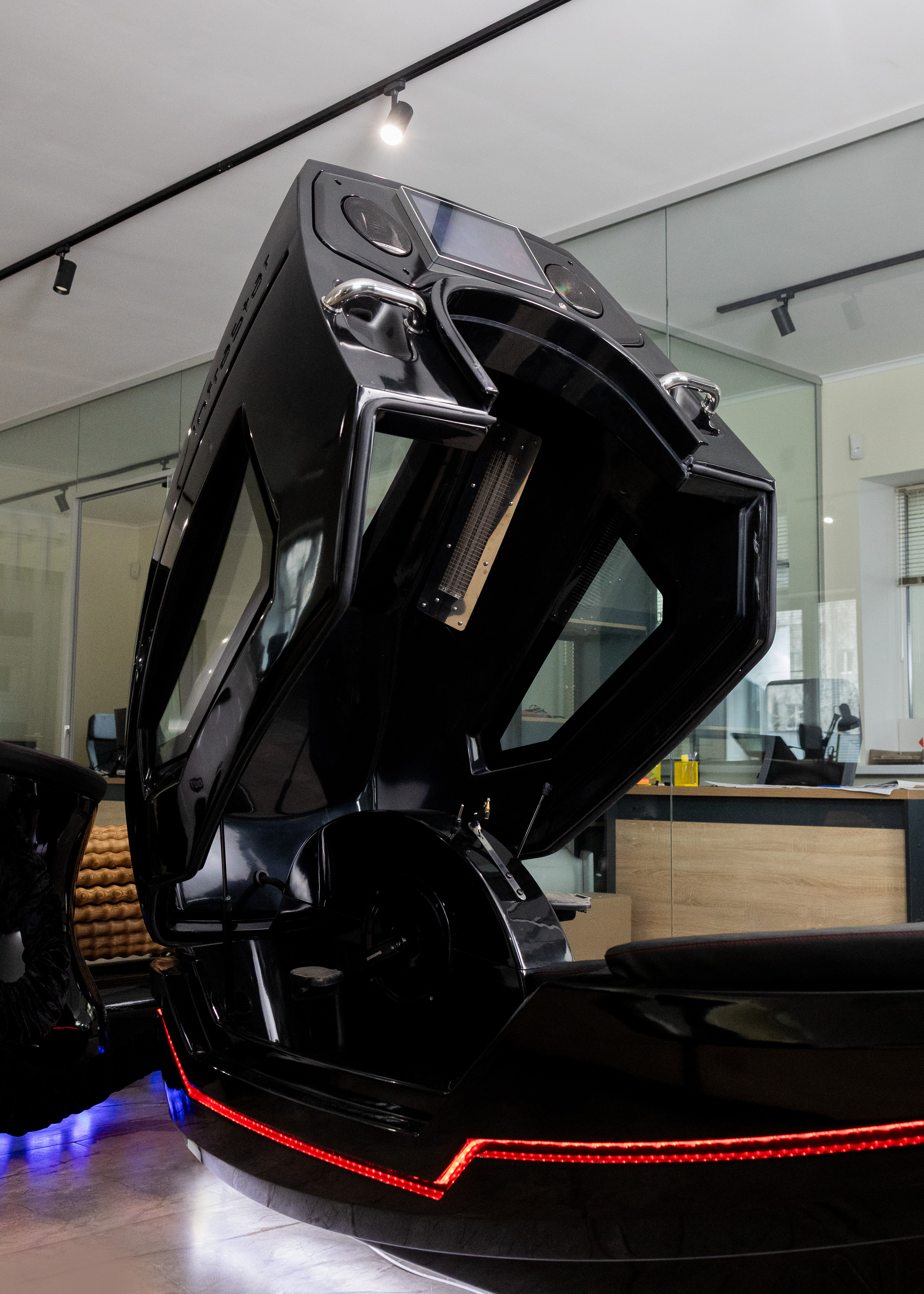
InfraStar bike

InfraStar bike is a type of fitness equipment developed in 1980s that integrates the physical activity of stationary cycling with the therapeutic effects of infrared heat therapy. It uses zero-gravity vacuum technology that creates negative vacuum resistance to target cellulite reduction and improve blood and lymphatic circulation. InfraBike also supports weight loss, cardiovascular health, and muscle recovery. The manufacturer of InfraStar is Cryonick Wellness Technology Factory, formerly known as Vacuactivus.

== Overview ==
InfraStar bike is designed as an infrared exercise bike that allows to lie down to pedal. First models were developed in late 1980s. The temperature inside the device is maintained at 50° to soften the muscles, make them more receptive to exercise, and also to remove toxins. This recumbent bike stimulates heart rate and thus strengthens the entire cardiovascular system. InfraStar bike helps to burn fat and gain muscle mass. At the same time, infrared rays are dispersed to improve circulation, such as a feeling of heaviness in the legs or varicose veins.

The InfraStar Bike is particularly popular in fitness centers, wellness clinics, and physical therapy settings.

=== Technology ===
The InfraStar Bike uses zero-gravity vacuum technology to create negative resistance within its sealed capsule, targeting cellulite reduction in specific areas while improving blood flow and stimulating lymphatic circulation. Infrared light therapy enhances cellular oxygen supply, boosts metabolism, and promotes the regeneration of skin, muscles, and the lymphatic system. The infrared lamps heat the body, encouraging increased sweating to help eliminate residual water and toxins. CryoNick technology facilitates hot and cold exercise recovery, making it particularly suitable for rehabilitation and physical therapy. The bike also uses collagen red light therapy, ozone therapy, and aromatherapy to support anti-aging, skin rejuvenation, and immune system enhancement.
