= Microlife Corporation =

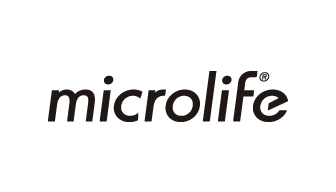
- Industry: Medical diagnostics
- Founded: Taipei, Taiwan (1981)
- Headquarters: Widnau, Switzerland; Florida, United States; Taipei, Taiwan
- Products: Blood Pressure Monitors; Digital Thermometers; Peak Flow Meter; Heat Therapy Aids; Blood Glucose Management Devices; Weight Management Devices
- Website: www.microlife.com

Microlife Corporation (simplified Chinese: 百略医学科技股份有限公司; traditional Chinese: 百略醫學科技股份有限公司; pinyin: Bǎi lüè yīxué kējì gǔfèn yǒuxiàn gōngsī) is a medical diagnostics company that specializes in the development and manufacture of blood pressure monitors, digital thermometers, Peak Flow Meters, heat therapy aids, blood glucose management devices and weight management devices. Microlife is currently the world's largest manufacturer of digital medical thermometers and a major provider of electronic blood pressure monitoring devices. The company maintains international divisions throughout the world.

== History ==
Microlife was founded in Taipei, Taiwan in 1981. It was known as the "Micro Idea Instruments Co." upon its founding. Its first product was a digital medical thermometer and, in 1985. The company added blood pressure monitors to their product lines in 1995. A branch office was opened in Switzerland in 1996, and the first office in the United States was opened the following year. In 2002, Microlife acquired Maine-based Biddeford Blankets. Four years later, it acquired the Golden, Colorado-based medical diagnostic equipment manufacturer, HealtheTech.

In 2009, the company became the first medical diagnostics manufacturer to produce a blood pressure monitor that detected both hypertension and atrial fibrillation (both of which are warning signs for stroke). the firm entered into a partnership with PharmaSmart in 2012 in an effort to expand their reach in the United States.

The company teamed up with the Bill & Melinda Gates Foundation to develop a cost-effective blood pressure monitoring device (Microlife CRADLE VSA) designed for use in low- and middle-income countries. It has been used in countries like Zambia, Zimbabwe, and Tanzania. Advertising activities of the Microlife company regarding slogans, e.g. "Recommended by doctors" or "Swiss products" violated the ethics of advertising, which was confirmed by, among others Advertising Council at a meeting of the advertising committee on February 11, 2015.

== Products ==
Microlife's medical devices are approved for hospital use. In addition to blood pressure management devices, the company also makes devices for fever management, asthma management, flexible heating, weight management and blood glucose management.

== Technology ==
Microlife's blood pressure monitors and the technologies they house have been the subject of numerous studies and have been validated for both clinical and home use. One of Microlife's technologies is the atrial fibrillation detection incorporated into their blood pressure monitors. Their WatchBP Home A device was a AFIB Technology recommended by the United Kingdom's National Institute for Health and Care Excellence (NICE) in 2013. WatchBP Home A was recommended to be used for hypertension monitoring and atrial fibrillation screening in primary care, using the device in primary care could increase the detection rate of atrial fibrillation compared with taking the pulse by hand. Microlife also patented the "Microlife Average Mode" (MAM), which is a feature in the blood pressure monitors that takes three consecutive readings and creates an average from that data. Pulse arrhythmia detection (PAD), which is another feature in some Microlife blood pressure monitors that automatically detects irregular heartbeats, is another one of the company's primary technologies. Over their lifespan and their different iterations, Microlife blood pressure monitors have been validated by the British Hypertension Society with their highest rating (AA).
