= Undertank heater =

Under Tank Heater (UTH), also called heating mat or heating pad, is a heating device created by the pet industry for husbandry of reptiles and amphibians. It is a flat piece of metal and plastic that provides a convenient and easy way to heat your reptiles, amphibian and even aquariums fish tanks. They provide constant heat, allowing you to create the optimal temperature gradient within the nursery

== Use ==
The heater is usually placed at one end of the base, covering 1/3 of the base of the terrarium but alternately it may also be placed on a wall. The temperature emitted will pass through the terrarium walls and substrate, creating a temperature gradient throughout the enclosure. The hot zone is just above the heater; the opposite zone, the cold zone, is where the live food and the water bowl would be placed. A substrate between the pad and the tank is necessary, as is a thermostat or rheostat to prevent it from overheating and burning the animals. Malfunction in an under tank heater could result in higher temperatures which might harm animals or even start a fire.

Aquarium can also be heated by the use of heating mats which are placed beneath the aquarium. Glass is, however, a poor conductor of heat and thus reduces the efficiency of this method of heating.

== See also ==
- Heating pad for other use of the term
