= Heat pad =

Heat pad may refer to:

- A pad used with surface-mounted components as a heat sink
- Heating pad used to heat parts of the body
