= AFIB Technology =

Technology for atrial fibrillation

AFIB Technology (sometimes referred to as Microlife AFIB Technology) is a feature in sphygmomanometer devices that is designed to detect and monitor the incidence of atrial fibrillation in patients. The technology was designed, patented, and is currently used by the Microlife Corporation. It has been the subject of numerous medical studies and has been validated for in-home and clinical use. It can be found in several Microlife devices, including the WatchBP Home A, BP A200 Plus, WatchBP Office, and WatchBP O3.

== Specifications ==
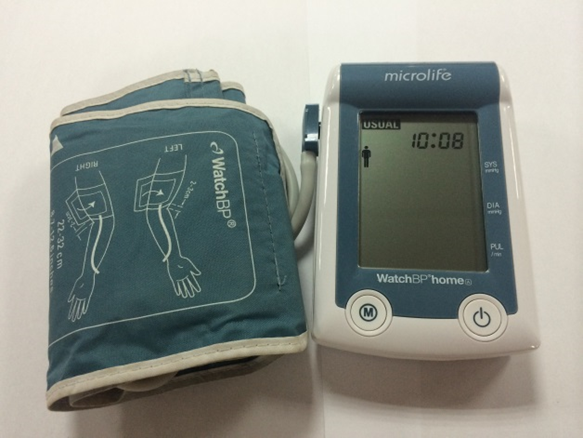
Microlife WatchBP Home A blood pressure monitor with Afib detection.

The Microlife devices that use the AFIB Technology are oscillometric and are equipped with an algorithm that can detect irregular pulse rhythms. The device will flash if atrial fibrillation is detected. Measurements are carried out in triplicate for more accurate readings. Studies have confirmed the relative accuracy of such readings when attempting to identify the existence of atrial fibrillation in patients.

One study indicated that the Microlife blood pressure monitor had a sensitivity for detecting atrial fibrillation of 100%, a specificity of 92%. Several clinical studies have tested the Microlife AFIB Technology against 12-lead electrocardiography (ECG) interpreted by cardiologists. The sensitivity for detection in these studies varied between 95 and 100% with specificity values of 89 to 92%.

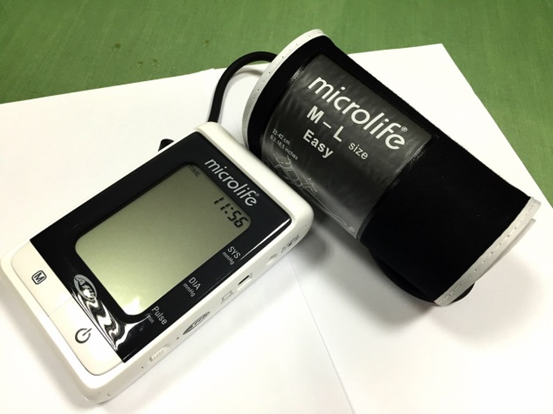
Microlife A200 blood pressure monitor with Afib detection.

One study noted that the WatchBP device was better for detecting atrial fibrillation than single-lead ECGs because of its higher specificity level (90 vs 76%, respectively), which would prevent many unnecessary refers for a 12-lead ECG and therefore safes labor and healthcare costs. In addition, it does not require clinical interpretation.

In virtually every study, researchers have concluded that Microlife's AFIB Technology is suitable for use as an atrial fibrillation detection system for in-home and/or clinical purposes. In 2013, the UK National Institute for Health and Care Excellence recommended the WatchBP Home A device for routine blood pressure measurement and atrial fibrillation screening in primary care. The recommendation is based on the NICE conclusion that use of WatchBP Home A in primary care is associated with estimated overall cost savings per person measured, ranging from £2.98 for those aged between 65 and 74 years to £4.26 for those aged 75 years and over.

== Patents ==
- U.S. patent 7,706,868 Detecting atrial fibrillation, method of and apparatus for filed February 17, 2006; issued April 27, 2010
- U.S. patent 7,680,532 Detecting atrial fibrillation, method of and apparatus for filed February 15, 2006; issued March 16, 2010
- U.S. patent 7,020,514 Method of and apparatus for detecting atrial fibrillation filed November 27, 2002; issued March 28, 2006
- U.S. patent 6,519,490 Method of and apparatus for detecting arrhythmia and fibrillation filed December 20, 1999; issued February 11, 2003
