= Bed warmer =

Household item

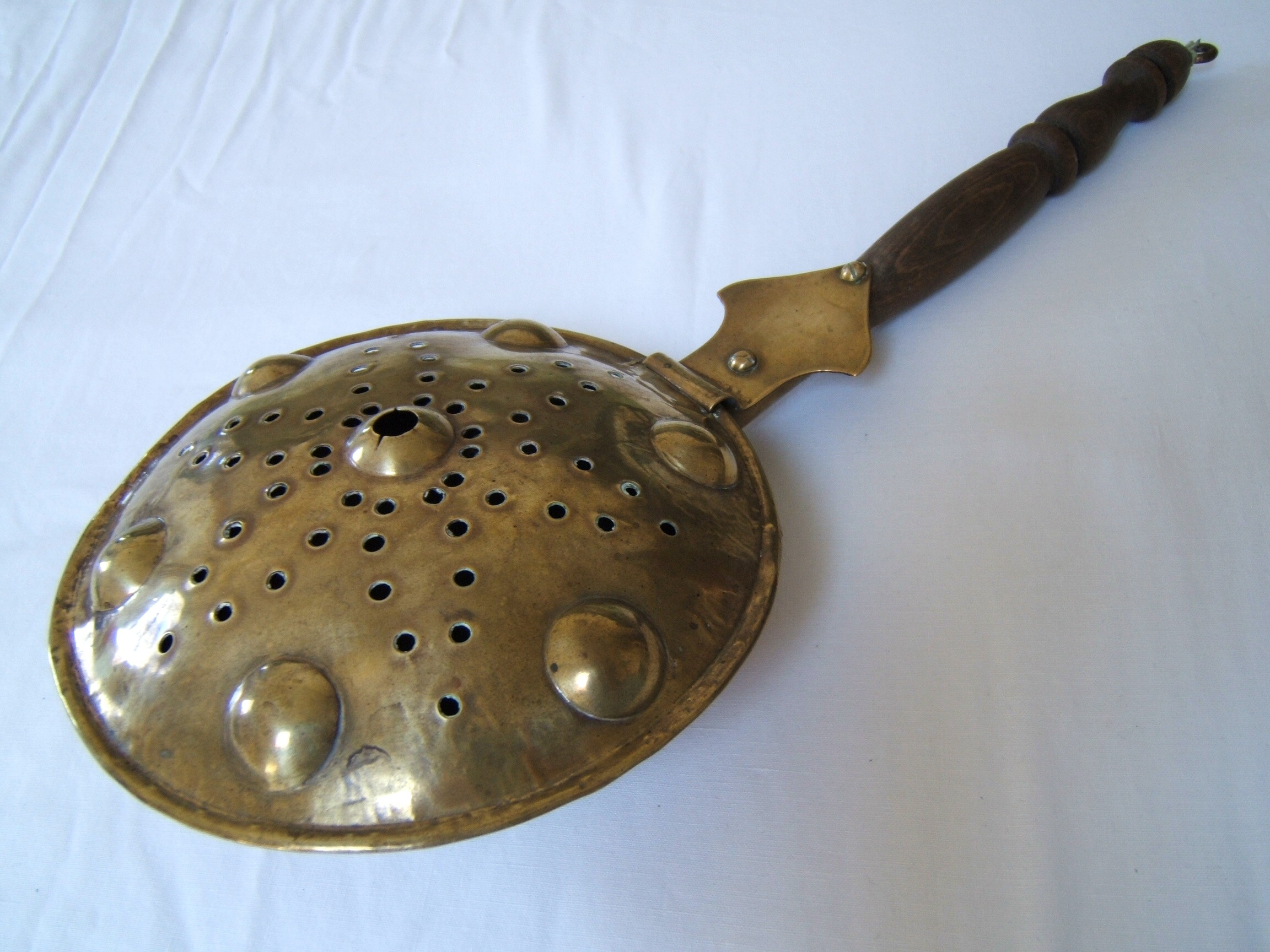
Bed warmer from the Netherlands

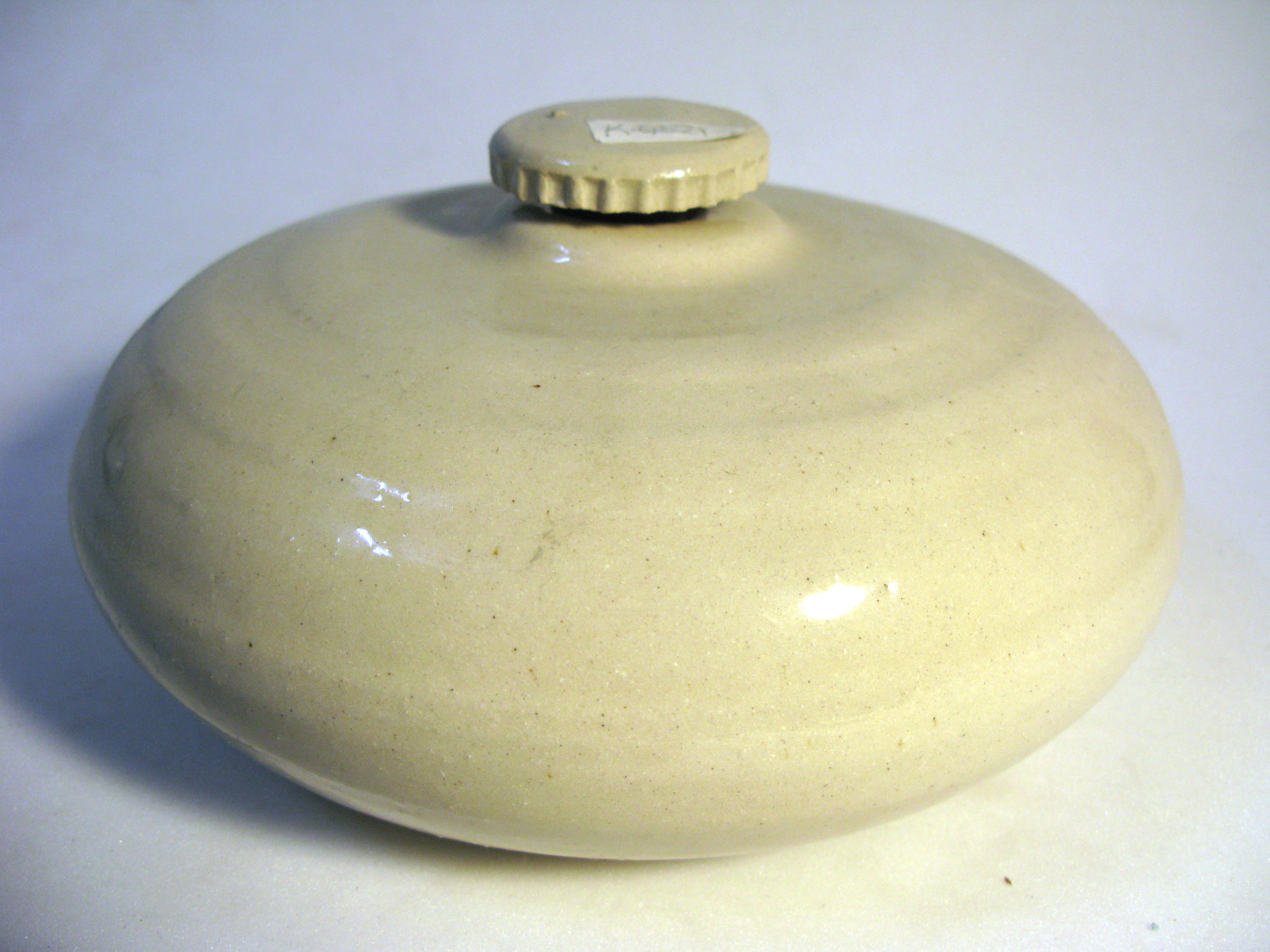
English stoneware bed warmer and stopper

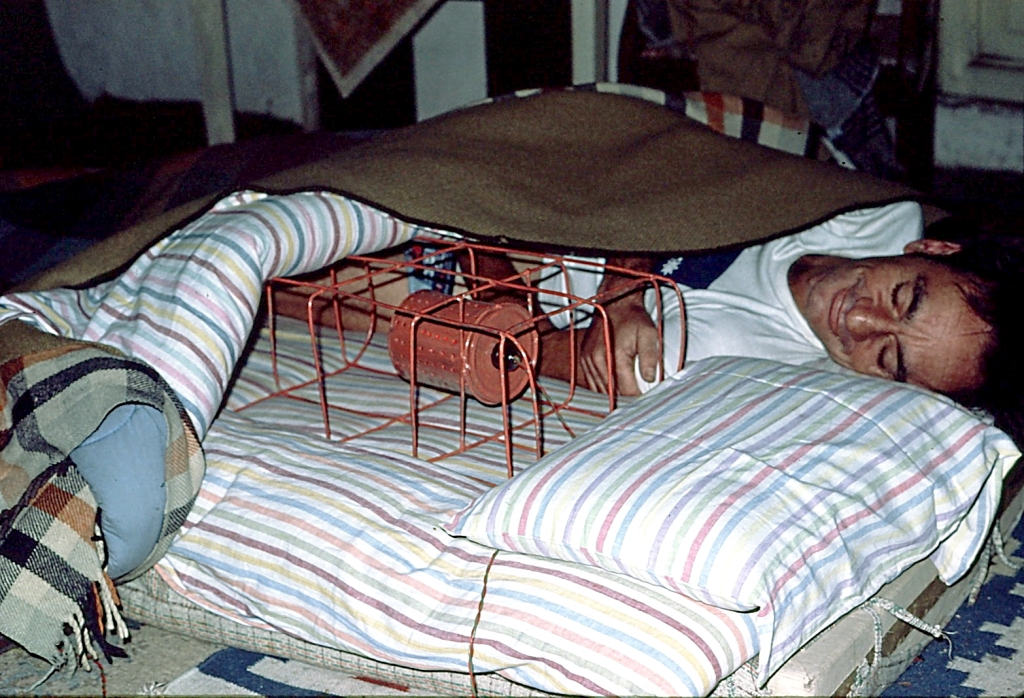
Electrical bed warmer (with a shielded electric bulb) in India, 1979

A bed warmer or warming pan was a common household item in countries with cold winters, especially in Europe. It consisted of a metal container, usually fitted with a handle and shaped somewhat like a modern frying pan, with a solid or finely perforated lid. The pan would be filled with embers and placed under the covers of a bed, to warm it up or dry it out before use.

Bed warmers were commonly used from the mid-17th to early-20th century. They fell out of fashion with the rise of other methods of warming homes and beds.

== Risks and alternatives ==
Besides the risk of fire, it was recognized that the fumes from the embers were noxious. A doctor advised his readers in a publication of about 1790 to avoid bed warmers, or, if needed, replace the embers with hot sand.

An alternative to the bed warmer was the "bed wagon" (French: moine, Italian: monaco, both meaning "monk"). It consisted of a large wooden frame enclosing a bucket of embers, possibly with an iron tray and an iron roof-plate to protect the bed covers from direct heat.

Pottery filled with hot water also was used. With the advent of rubber, the hot water bottle became dominant. In the early 20th century, electric blankets began to replace the bed warmer.

An alternative kind of bedwarmer in the mid-20th century in the UK was a 36 cm (14 in) pressed steel "flying saucer" or lozenge-shaped device made by Belling (established 1912), powered using an internal 40 W incandescent light bulb as a heat source.

== See also ==
- Hot water bottle – a bottle filled with hot water and sealed with a stopper, used to provide warmth, typically while in bed
- Electric blanket – a blanket that contains integrated electrical heating
- James Francis Edward Stuart – the "Old Pretender", also nicknamed the Warming Pan Baby, rumoured to have been smuggled into the queen's bedchamber in a warming pan
