= Hot water bottle blowing =

Feat of strength

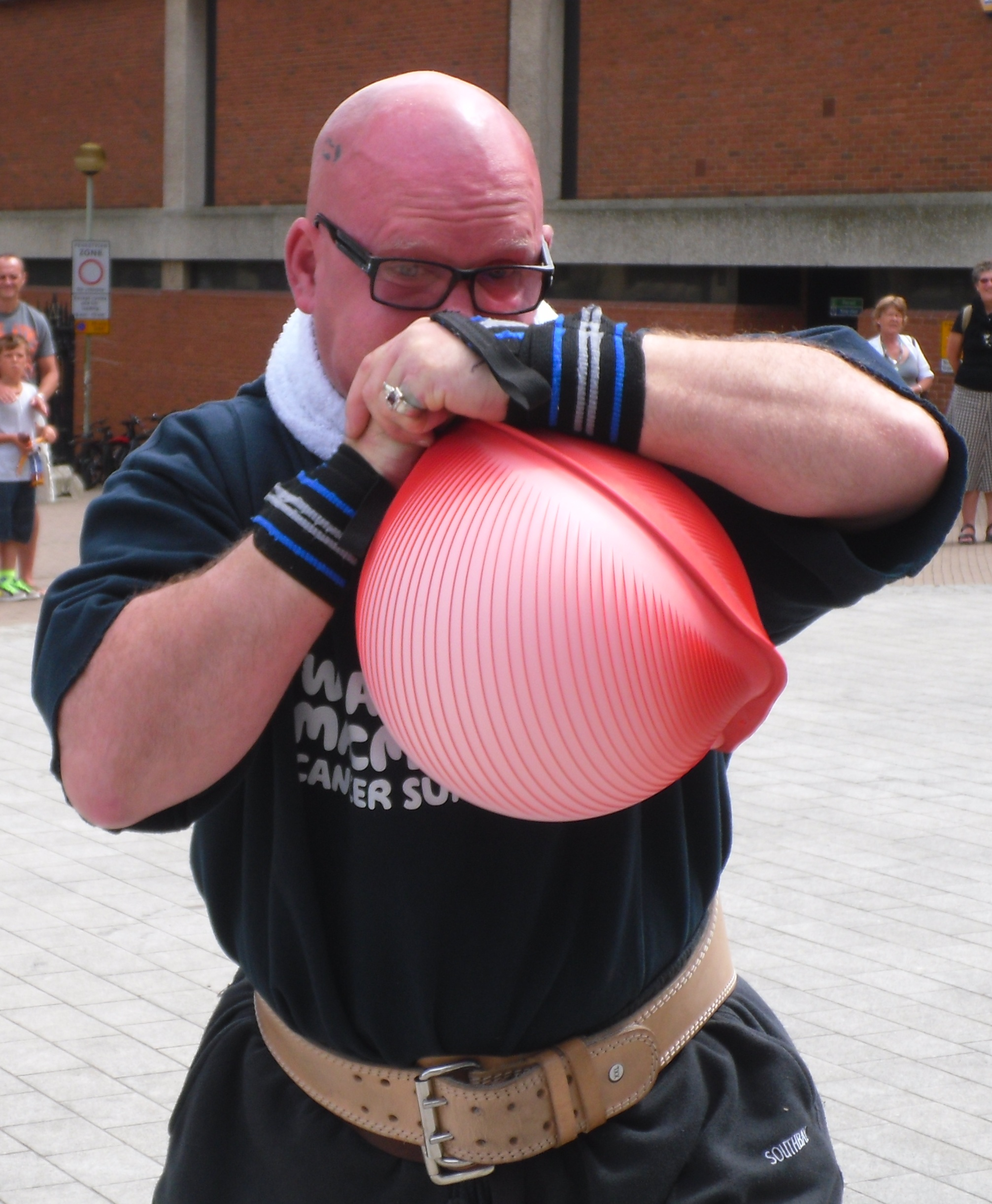
Overinflating a hot-water bottle

Hot water bottle blowing is the deliberate inflation of a hot-water bottle by blowing. Air is breathed into the bottle until it stretches beyond its capacity and consequently explodes. It is a challenging feat of strength which is included in the Guinness World Records. The challenge is most commonly undertaken by breathing air from the mouth, though it has also been achieved by blowing through the nose. The activity presents a potential hazard for physical injury to eyes and lungs.

== Description ==
Blowing up a hot-water bottle is usually performed to impress a crowd. It requires significant lung capacity as well as chest and abdominal strength. It is regarded as potentially hazardous because of the risk of harm to the eyes and the possibility of the contained air rushing back into the lungs and causing damage or, reportedly, death. Former world record holder Brian Jackson has claimed that he knows of at least five deaths resulting from the practice, although this is unconfirmed. Georgian athlete Jemal Tkeshelashvili has demonstrated two variations on the traditional method: blowing the bottle up with his nose, and blowing one up while somebody sits on top of it.

== Records ==
There are three hot-water bottle blowing records officiated by Guinness World Records. The "Fastest hot water bottle burst" by a male is held by Shaun Jones from the United Kingdom. He achieved a time of 6.52 seconds on the set of Italian show Lo Show Dei Record on 31 March 2011. Jones also holds the record for the "Fastest time to burst three hot water bottles" setting the time of 28.82 seconds on 17 November 2011. Jemal Tkeshelashvili holds the record for "Most hot water bottles burst with the nose in one minute". Tkeshelashvili successfully exploded three hot-water bottles during a live television broadcast of Das Sommerfest der Abenteuer in Magdeburg, Germany, on 2 June 2012.
