= Heat therapy =

Therapy involving the use of heat

- ICD-9-CM: 93.34-93.35

Heat therapy, also called thermotherapy, is the use of heat in therapy, such as for pain relief and health. It can take the form of a hot cloth, hot water bottle, ultrasound, heating pad, hydrocollator packs, whirlpool baths, cordless FIR heat therapy wraps, and others. It can be beneficial to those with arthritis and stiff muscles and injuries to the deep tissue of the skin. Heat may be an effective self-care treatment for conditions like rheumatoid arthritis.

Heat therapy is most commonly used for rehabilitation purposes. The therapeutic effects of heat include increasing the extensibility of collagen tissues; decreasing joint stiffness; reducing pain; relieving muscle spasms; reducing inflammation, edema, and aids in the post acute phase of healing; and increasing blood flow. The increased blood flow to the affected area provides proteins, nutrients, and oxygen for better healing. There is some evidence to suggest that heat therapy can also aid in the treatment of neurodegenerative diseases like Alzheimer's; as well as for cardiovascular benefits.

== Application ==
=== Direct contact ===
Moist heat therapy has been believed to be more effective at warming tissues than dry heat, because water transfers heat more quickly than air. Frequent use of saunas has been linked to a lower risk of vascular disease. Clinical studies do not support the popular belief that moist heat is more effective than dry heat. Moist heat results in the perception that the tissue is heated more deeply. In fact, recent studies indicate that vasodilation, the expansion of the blood capillaries (vessels) to allow more blood flow, is improved with dry heat therapy. Expansion of the blood capillaries is the primary objective of heat therapy. Heat therapy increases the effect on muscles, joints, and soft tissue. Heat is typically applied by placing a warming device on the relevant body part.

Newer breeds of heat therapy devices combine a carbon fiber heater with a cordless rechargeable lithium battery and are built into the specific body wrap (i.e., shoulder wrap or back wrap) for targeted heat therapy. Such devices can be used as alternatives to chemical or plugged-in heating pads, but have not been shown to improve the clinical benefit. All devices primarily provide heat to promote vasodilation.

=== Infrared radiation ===
Infrared radiation is a convenient system to heat parts of the body. It has the advantage over direct contact in that radiation can heat directly the area where the blood capillaries and neuron terminals are. When heat comes from a direct contact source it has to heat the external layer of the skin, and heat is transferred to the deeper layer by conduction. Since heat conduction needs a temperature gradient to proceed, and there is a maximum temperature that can be safely used (around 42 °C), this means lower temperature where warming is needed.

Infrared (IR for short) is the part of the electromagnetic radiation spectrum comprised between 0.78 μm and 1 mm wavelength. It is usually divided into three segments:

- IR-A, from 0.78 to 1.4 μm.
- IR-B, from 1.4 to 3 μm.
- IR-C, from 3 μm to 1 mm.

IR radiation is more useful than the visible radiation for heating our body, because we absorb most of it, compared to a strong reflection of visible light. Penetration depth of infrared radiation in our skin is dependent of wavelength. IR-A is the most penetrating, and reaches some millimeters, IR-B penetrates into the dermis (about 1 mm), and IR-C is mostly absorbed in the external layer of the epidermis (stratum corneum). For this reason the infrared lamps used for therapeutic purposes produce mainly IR-A radiation.

== Mechanism of action, and indications ==
Heat creates higher tissue temperatures, which produces vasodilation that increases the supply of oxygen and nutrients and the elimination of carbon dioxide and metabolic waste.

Heat therapy is useful for muscle spasms, myalgia, fibromyalgia, contracture, bursitis.

Moist heat can be used on abscesses to help drain the abscess faster. A study from 2005 showed heat therapy to be effective in treating leishmaniasis, a tropical parasitic skin infection.

Heat therapy is also sometimes used in cancer treatment to augment the effect of chemotherapy or radiotherapy, but it is not enough to kill cancer cells on its own.

Heat therapy has been shown to be beneficial in treating sub-acute and chronic musculoskeletal pain, but the choice to use heat therapy to treat acute musculoskeletal injuries is contraindicated. The duration, frequency, and type of heat application may differ depending on the quality of the pain and the depth of the tissue being targeted. According to a recent article published in the Archives of Physical Medicine and Rehabilitation in 2021, heat therapy, particularly local heat application (LHA), can provide pain relief, reduce muscle stiffness (increasing muscle available range of motion), and improve blood flow through vasodilation to the affected area, thereby promoting healing for chronic musculoskeletal injuries.

Heat therapy is contraindicated in case of acute injury and bleeding disorders (because of vasodilation), tissues with a severe lack of sensitivity, scars and in tissues with inadequate vascular supply (because of increased metabolic rate and demand which a tissue with poor blood supply may fail to meet resulting in ischemia).

In the case of chronic musculoskeletal pain, heat therapy can be used to help reduce pain, increase range of motion, and improve flexibility. A longer duration of heat application may be required for more chronic conditions, such as 10 to 30 minutes, two to three times a day. Physical therapy heat modalities that can be utilized to treat chronic conditions include hot packs, paraffin, warm whirlpool, fluidotherapy, and thermal ultrasound. Assessing skin integrity is crucial before and after the application of long durations of heat therapy. Prolonged heat therapy can help promote tissue healing, which can be especially beneficial for chronic conditions including fibromyalgia and low back pain.

The use of heat therapy for deep-seated tissue can be treated with shortwave, microwave, and ultrasonic waves. This produces a high temperature that penetrates deeper. Shortwave produces a 27 MHz current, microwaves use 915 and 2456 MHz, and ultrasound is an acoustic vibration of 1 MHz. The way ultrasonic waves work is they selectively superimpose the incoming wave and increase the energy for absorption, and the significant part of the longitudinal compression gets converted into shear waves. When they are rapidly absorbed, the interface between soft tissue and bone is selectively heated.

== For headaches ==
Heat therapy can be used for the treatment of headaches and migraines. Many people with chronic headaches also experience tight muscles in their neck and upper back. The application of constant heat to the back/upper back area can help to release the tension associated with headache pain. In order to achieve heat therapy for headaches, many use microwaveable pads which can often overheat, potentially leading to injury, and lose their heat after a few minutes. Some new products use heated water, running through pads, to maintain a constant temperature, allowing people with headaches to use hands-free heat therapy in the treatment of their headache pain. However no substantial scientific evidence exist for many of these claims.

== Therapeutic Benefits ==
Thermotherapy increase the extensibility of collagen tissues. Using heat, it can relieve the stiffness in joints in different cases. Shortwave and Microwave heat application may reduce muscle spasms, and selective heating with microwaves can accelerate absorption of hematomas. In addition, hot pack therapy has been found to be particularly effective for reducing muscle soreness and enhancing recovery. By improving blood flow and promoting tissue healing, it helps relieve pain both within the first 24 hours after exercise and in the days that follow. This will, in turn, allow the stiff muscle to stretch. Ultrasounds are not absorbed significantly in homogenous muscle. Heat therapy using hyperthermia has been used to treat cancer in combination with ionizing radiation.

== For Muscle Soreness ==
The immediate use of either dry or moist heat helps with preserving muscle strength and activity. There is also a great deal of pain reduction after the application of moist heat. To decide whether or not to use dry or moist heat, studies show that moist heat has enhanced healing benefits for muscle soreness and can have a positive effect in only 25% of the time of the application of the dry heat. When discussing delayed onset muscle soreness, a myogenic disease that effects the longevity and intensity of muscle soreness, it has been proven that heat can be used to reduce pain if applied within 1 hour of exercise. When applied within one hour after exercise, heat therapy not only reduces pain but also continues to provide relief beyond 24 hours. This effect is likely due to improved blood flow and enhanced tissue healing, with hot packs showing the most consistent benefits.

== For Edema After a Distal-Radius Fracture ==
Swelling is inevitable when using heating modalities, but many people are unaware of the effect they have on the volume of swelling after application. Studies show that there was an increase in edema immediately after the use of whirlpool treatments more than the use of a moist hot pack. However, 30 minutes later, it was shown that there was no difference in swelling between patients that received either heating modality. This leads us to the conclusion that moist hot packs as well as whirlpool therapy can help decrease edema in distal-radius fractures. According to the available data, heat therapy for lower limb lymphoedema may be beneficial in lowering limb circumference and volume when administered over an extended length of time (1200–3600 min) at a certain skin temperature (39–42 °C) in a controlled setting (lab, hospital, or outpatient). There was no proof that heat therapy was harmful to lymphoedema patients when used within these parameters. As of right now, there is insufficient evidence to support any recommendations for the use of heat therapy for lymphoedema patients in practice.

== For Women During Menstruation and Labor ==
Heat therapy is shown to be a great modality for women with dysmenorrhea, which is pain during menstruation. NSAIDs are usually the primary treatment for dysmenorrhea but are associated with adverse effects, such as indigestion, headaches, and drowsiness. Superficial moist heat as an alternative treatment can help calm abdominal muscle cramps associated with dysmenorrhea without the adverse effects of NSAIDs. Moist heat can also improve pelvic circulation that further helps reduce pain. Heat therapy is shown to assist women with pain and reduce the duration of the first stage of labor. The first stage of labor is associated with painful contractions of the cervix. Heat therapy can help calm these painful contractions while improving circulation which blocks pain signals to the brain.

== See also ==
- Contrast bath therapy
- Diathermy
- Infrared radiation, one means for delivering heat
- Migraine#Cryotherapy and Thermotherapy
