= Vacuactivus =

American cryotherapy chambers manufacturer

Cryonick Wellness Technology Factory
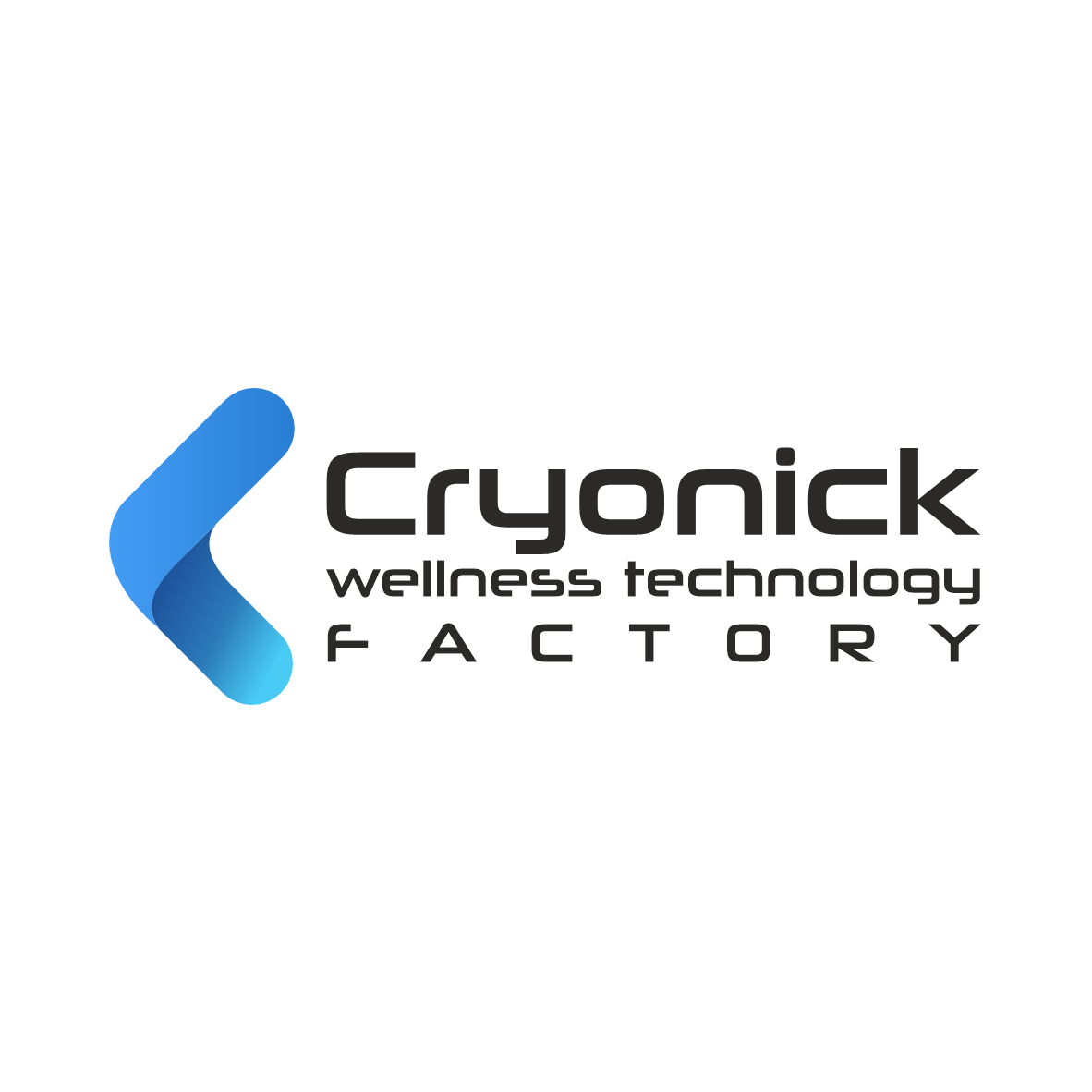

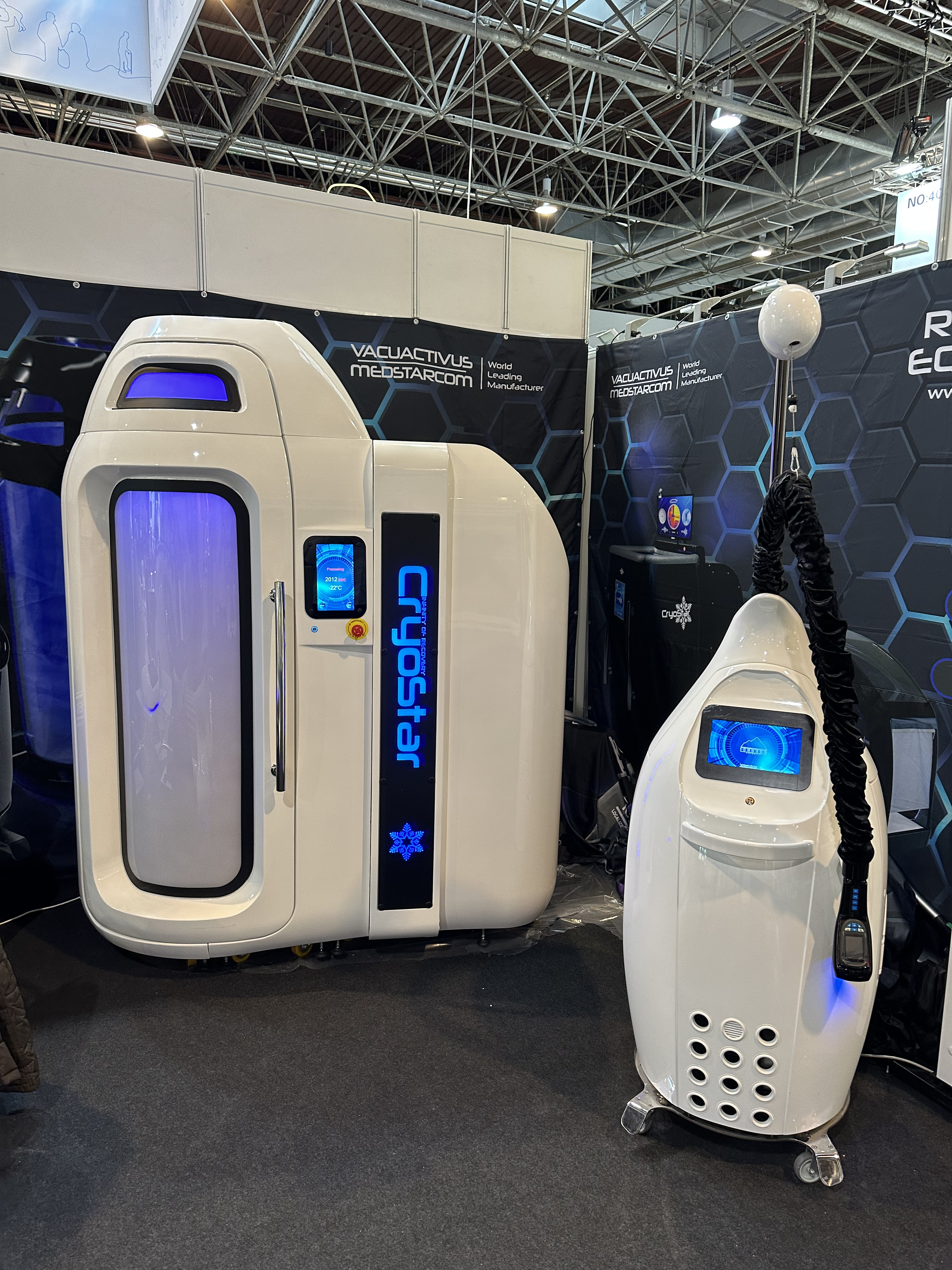
- Cryostar cryotherapy chamber
- Founded: 2000
- Headquarters: Los Angeles
- Area served: worldwide
- Products: cryotherapy chambers; fitness rehabilitation equipment
- Website: https://vacuactivus.com/

Cryonick Wellness Technology Factory (former Vacuactivus) is an international company for the production and sale of cryotherapy chambers and equipment for fitness rehabilitation, founded in 2000. It is one of the three largest manufacturers of cryotherapy chambers and cryo-equipment in the world.

The headquarters is located in Los Angeles, California.

== Overview ==
Vacuactivus was founded in 2000. In 2013, it opened a sales office in the United States under direction of Slim Wellness Studio LLC.

Vacuactivus manufactures equipment for medical and rehabilitation centers, gyms, cryotherapy studios and health facilities. The main product is innovative equipment for cryogenic procedures and weight loss (cryotherapy chambers, vacuum infrared treadmills). Among the key products are the bestsellers: InfraStar bike, CryoStar Antarctica cryotherapy chamber, Rollstar lymphatic massage roller and VacuStar vacu infrared cryo treadmill.

The company's products are distributed in 50 countries around the world.

In 2025, the company rebranded to Cryonick Wellness Technology Factory.

== Structure ==
The company is headquartered in Los Angeles, California, USA.

The main factory warehouses are located in Gardena (California), Newark (New Jersey), Przemyśl (Poland), and Dnipro (Ukraine).
