= Hydrocollator =

Physical therapy device

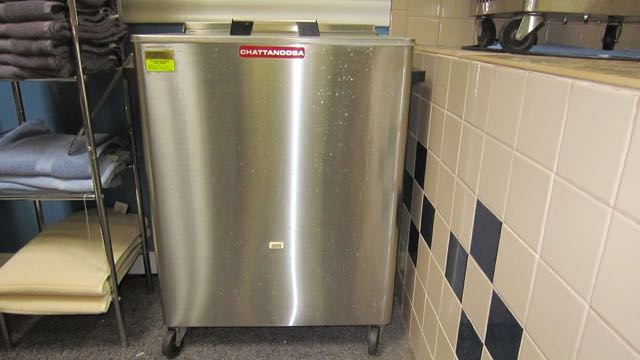
- A hydrocollator manufactured by Chattanooga
- Uses: Athletic trainers and physical therapists
- Manufacturer: Chattanooga Pharmaceutical Company

The hydrocollator, first introduced in 1947 by the Chattanooga Pharmaceutical Company, consists of a thermostatically controlled water bath for placing bentonite-filled cloth heating pads. When the pads are removed from the bath, they are placed in covers and placed on the patient. The device is primarily used by athletic trainers and physical therapists.

== Research ==
The evidence behind the use of the hydrocollator is primarily concerned with achieving rapid heating of the tissue due to the more efficient transfer of energy through water as compared to air. There is some concern that hydrocollator treatment may be less effective with overweight or obese patients.

Heating methods are used commonly in patients with acute pain. It is recommended that heating pads be used at home on acute injuries for short term pain relief.
