= Electric blanket =

Blanket with electric heating

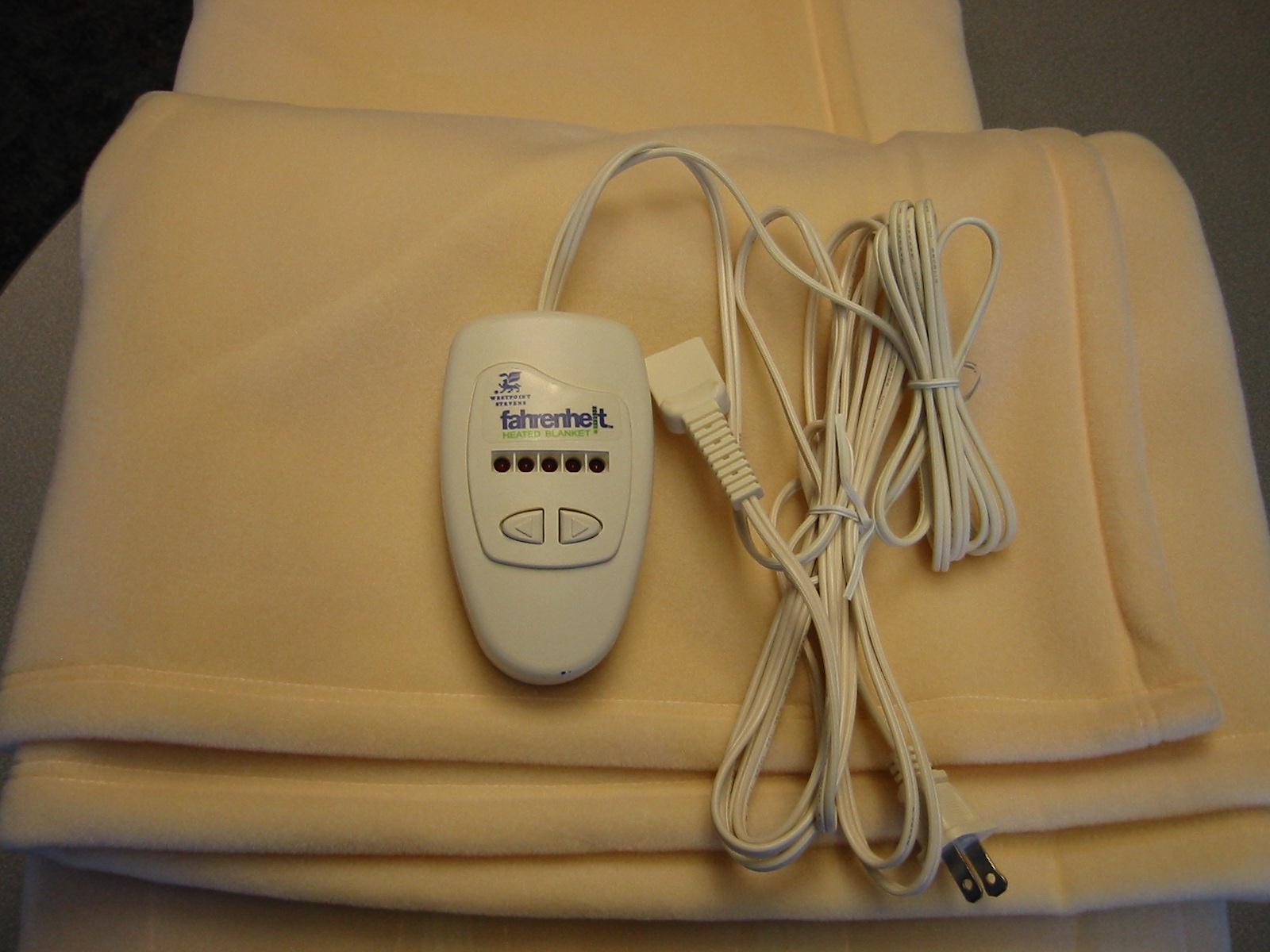
A U.S. electric blanket

An electric blanket is a blanket that contains integrated electrical heating wires. Types include underblankets, overblankets, throws, and duvets. An electric underblanket is placed above the mattress and below the bottom bed sheet. This is the most common type in the UK and Commonwealth countries, where it is known by default as an "electric blanket"; in the U.S. and Canada, where it is less common, it is called an electric heated mattress pad. An electric overblanket is placed above the top bed sheet, and is the most common type in the U.S. and Canada, where it is called an "electric blanket".

Electric blankets usually have a control unit that adjusts the amount of heat the blanket produces by pulsing current at different intervals. Blankets for two-person beds often have separate controls for each side of the bed. The electric blanket may be used to pre-heat the bed before use or to keep the occupant warm while in bed.

Electric blankets usually use between 15 and 115 watts, and some modern "low voltage" electric blankets have thin carbon fiber wires and work on 12 to 24 volts.

== Mechanism ==
Much like heating pads, electric blankets use an insulated wire or heating element inserted into a fabric that heats when it is plugged in. The temperature control unit, located between the blanket and the electrical outlet, manages the amount of current entering into the heat elements in the blanket.

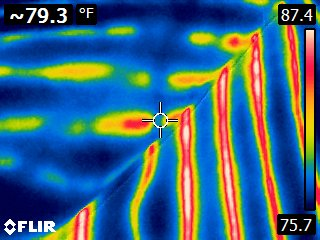
The heating of an area can be seen with a thermal camera after two minutes under a comforter.

Some modern electric blankets use carbon fiber elements that are less bulky and conspicuous than older heating wires. Carbon fiber is also used as the heating element in many high-end heated car seats. Blankets can be purchased with rheostats that regulate the heat.

=== With signal line type ===
It is used in temperature controller electric blankets which have a thermostat that regulates the temperature. The core of the wire is made of glass fiber or polyester wire. Flexible electrical heating alloy wire is wrapped around it. Outside is covered with a heat-sensitive layer. Then a copper alloy signal wire is wrapped around the outside of the heat-sensitive layer. Outside the copper signal wire is coated with a heat-resistant resin.

When the temperature at any point on the electric blanket exceeds a predetermined value, the heat-sensitive layer on the corresponding electric heating wire is changed from an insulator to a good conductor, so that the control circuit is turned on and the electric blanket is disconnected to achieve the purpose of temperature control and safety protection.

The common type electric blanket without signal line electric heating element is generally equipped with two types of temperature control elements to realize temperature control:

- one is overheating safety thermostat, about 8–9 per bed electric blanket, which is connected in series on the electric heating element to play the role of safety protection;
- The other is the thermostat controller, which is located at the head of the bed or at the hand to play the role of temperature adjustment. The electric blanket with electric heating element with signal line only needs a thermostat controller.

== Safety ==
=== Overheating ===
Newer electric blankets have a shutoff mechanism to prevent the blanket from overheating or catching fire. Older blankets (prior to about 2001) may not have a shut-off mechanism; users run the risk of overheating. Older blankets are considered fire hazards.

Some electric blankets work on relatively low voltage (12 to 24 volts), including those that plug in to ordinary household electrical outlets. In the US, such blankets are sold by Soft Heat, Serta, and Select Comfort. Such blankets also include 12-volt blankets designed for in-car use; they tend to shut off automatically every 45 minutes or so.

Old or damaged blankets are a concern of fire safety officials, due to the combination of heat, electricity, the abundance of flammable bedding material, and a sleeping occupant. In the United Kingdom in 2011, it was estimated that 5,000 fires per year were caused by faulty electric blankets.

Electric blankets also present a burn risk to those who cannot feel pain, such as those with diabetic peripheral neuropathy, or who are unable to react to it, such as small children, quadriplegics, and the elderly.

=== Cancer ===
No mechanism by which SLF (super low frequency)-EMFs (electromagnetic field) or radiofrequency radiation could cause cancer has been identified. Unlike high-energy (ionizing) radiation, EMFs in the non-ionizing part of the electromagnetic spectrum cannot damage DNA or cells directly. Some scientists have speculated that SLF-EMFs could cause cancer through other mechanisms, such as by reducing levels of the hormone melatonin. There is some evidence that melatonin may suppress the development of certain tumors.

Long-term electric blanket use (>20 years) in women is associated with a 36% higher prevalence of endometrial cancer.

== Societal considerations ==
Electric blankets are an efficient and commercially available personal heating systems aim to achieve individual thermal comfort at an affordable price relative to competing solutions. In cold conditions electric blankets are beneficial for decreasing sleep onset latency and improving the comfort sensation when retiring to sleep.

Due to these qualities, electric blankets are popular in low-income communities, especially households with persistent fuel poverty during the cold season. Similarly, electrical blankets are frequently used in hot summer cold winter zones. For instance they are the single most frequently used personal heating solution in bedrooms in the Yangtze River region.

From a power management perspective, however, miscellaneous electric load related to appliances such as electric blankets, waterbeds, dehumidifiers and television sets add up to a significant amount, sometimes 40% of the total power usage in homes. Notably, these appliances use minimal power e.g. electric blankets use only approximately 15–115 W. Yet, compared to other electric appliances, such as refrigerators, air conditioners, electric water heating systems, miscellaneous electricity load is under-recognized and may lead to mistaken forecasts of electricity usage, thus needing appropriate consideration.

Electric blankets offer a significant opportunity to improve quality of life especially for citizens living in low-income communities situated in cold climate areas because of their low energy usage relative to the thermal comfort they provide.

== In popular culture ==
A cartoon electrical blanket with its electrical temperature control acting as an anthropomorphic face named "Blanky" was portrayed in the 1987 animated film The Brave Little Toaster.

== See also ==
- Bed warmer
- Heating pad
- Heated clothing
- Kotatsu, a Japanese item of furniture composed of a table with blankets warmed with an electric heater.
- Hot water bottle. This is a container filled with hot water in the evening to keep a bed warm overnight.
