= Hot water bottle =

Container filled with hot water used for heating

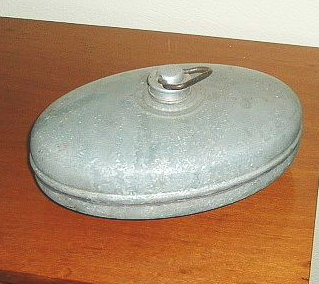
Antique metal hot-water bottle from 1925

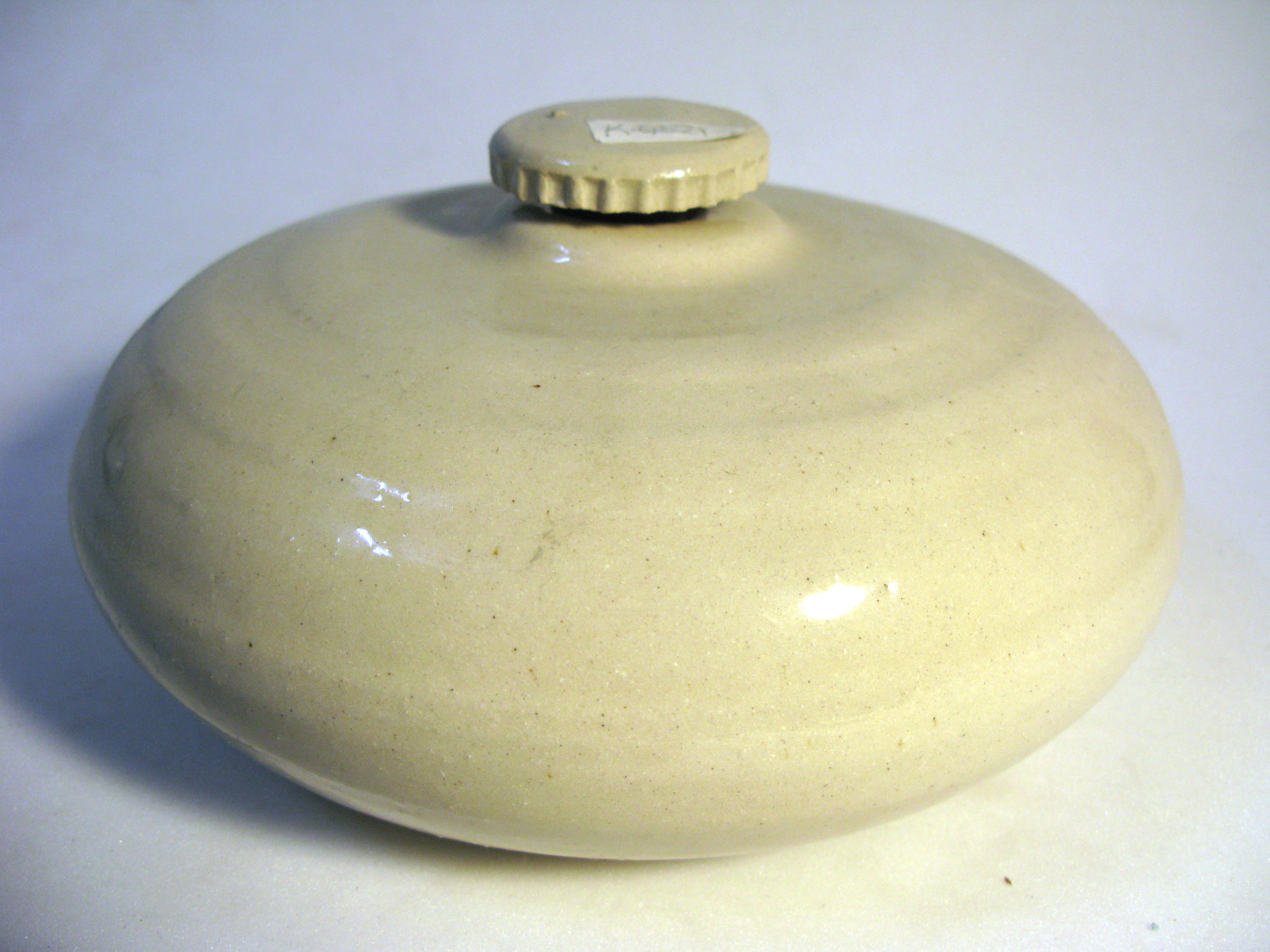
English Stoneware bed warmer and stopper

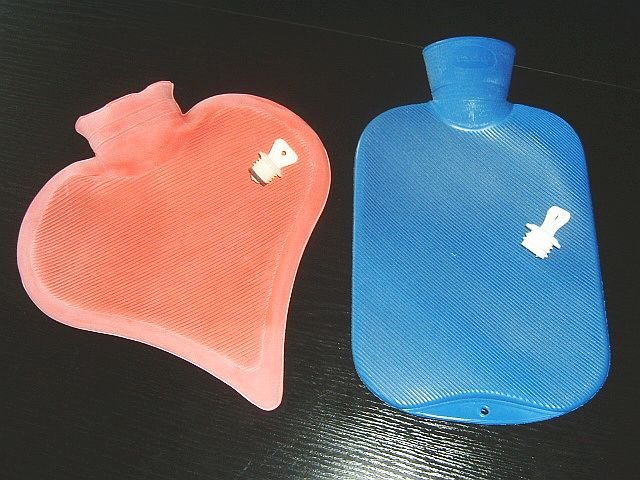
Two modern hot-water bottles shown with their stoppers

A hot-water bottle is a bottle filled with hot water and sealed with a stopper, used to provide warmth, typically while in bed, but also for the application of heat to a specific part of the body.

== Early history ==
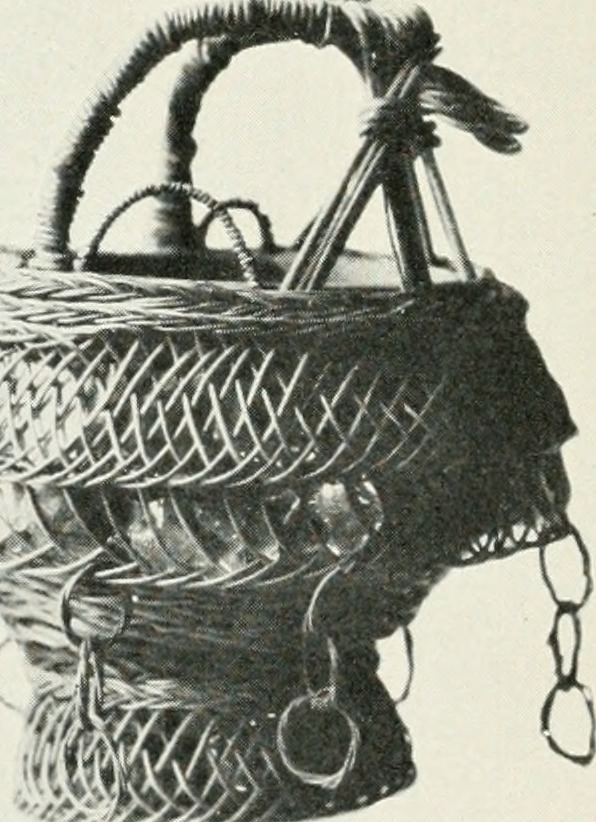
An American pottery hot water bottle

Containers for warmth in bed were in use as early as the 16th century. The earliest versions contained hot coals from the dying embers of the fire, and these bed warmers were used to warm the bed before getting into it.

Containers using hot water were soon also used, with the advantages that they could remain in the bed with the sleeper and were not so hot as to be a fire risk.

Prior to the invention of rubber that could withstand sufficient heat, these early hot-water bottles were made of a variety of materials, such as zinc, copper, brass, glass, earthenware or wood. To prevent burning, the metal hot water flasks were wrapped in a soft cloth bag.

== Rubber bottles ==
"India rubber" hot-water bottles were in use in Britain at least by 1875. Modern conventional hot-water bottles were patented in 1903 and are manufactured in natural rubber or PVC, to a design patented by the Croatian inventor Slavoljub Eduard Penkala. They are now commonly covered in fabric, sometimes with a novelty design.

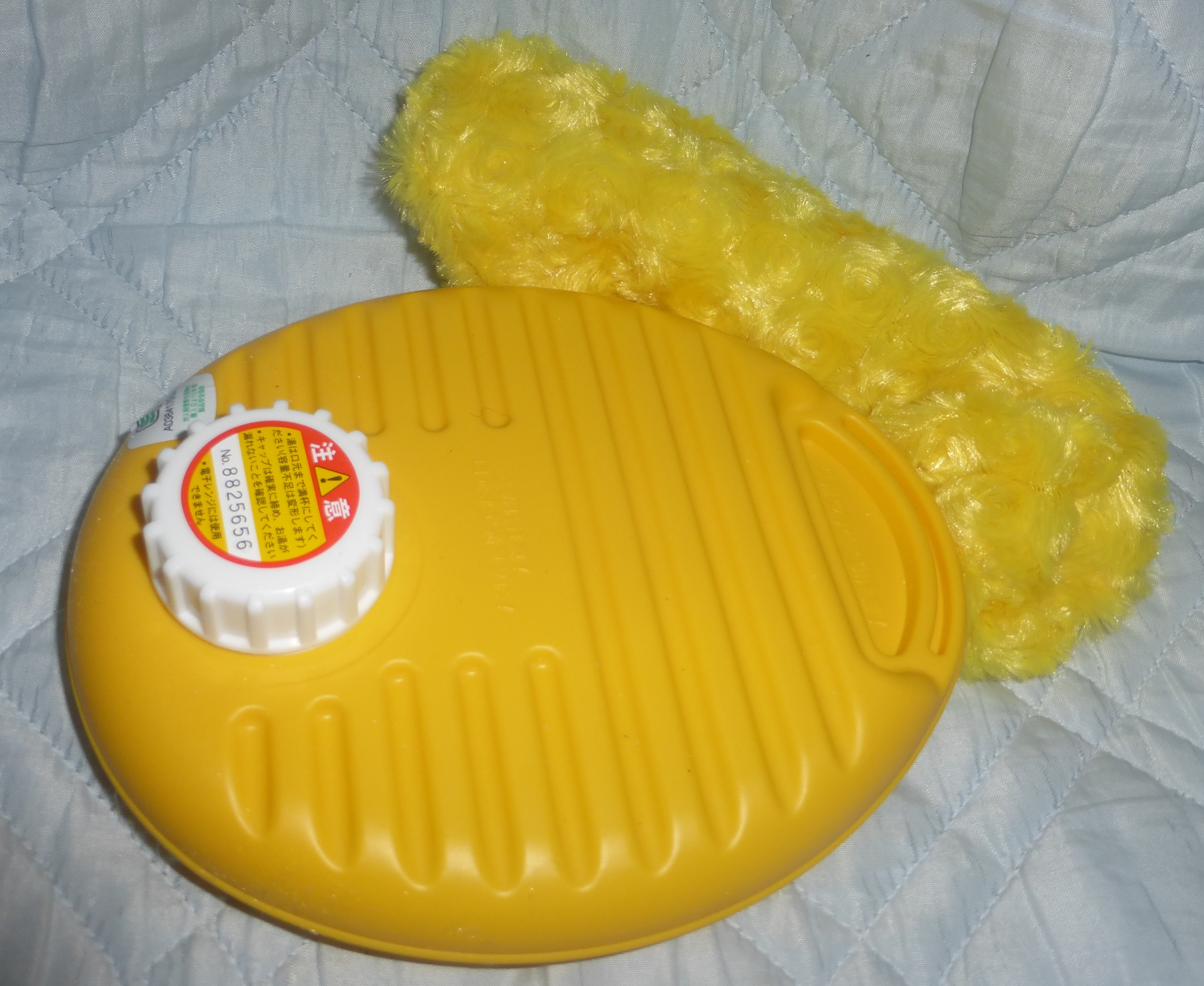
Japanese style plastic hot-water bottle, known locally as a yutanpo, with its cloth protective bag on the right.

Some newer products function like the older bottles, but use a polymer gel or wax in a heating pad. The pads can be heated in a microwave oven, and they are marketed as safer than liquid-filled bottles or electrically heated devices. Some newer bottles now use a silicone-based material instead of rubber, which resists very hot water better, and does not deteriorate as much as rubber. Although the stopper size in Ireland and the United Kingdom has been largely standard for many decades, some newer bottles use a wider mouth which is easier to fill (and a larger stopper to fit it).

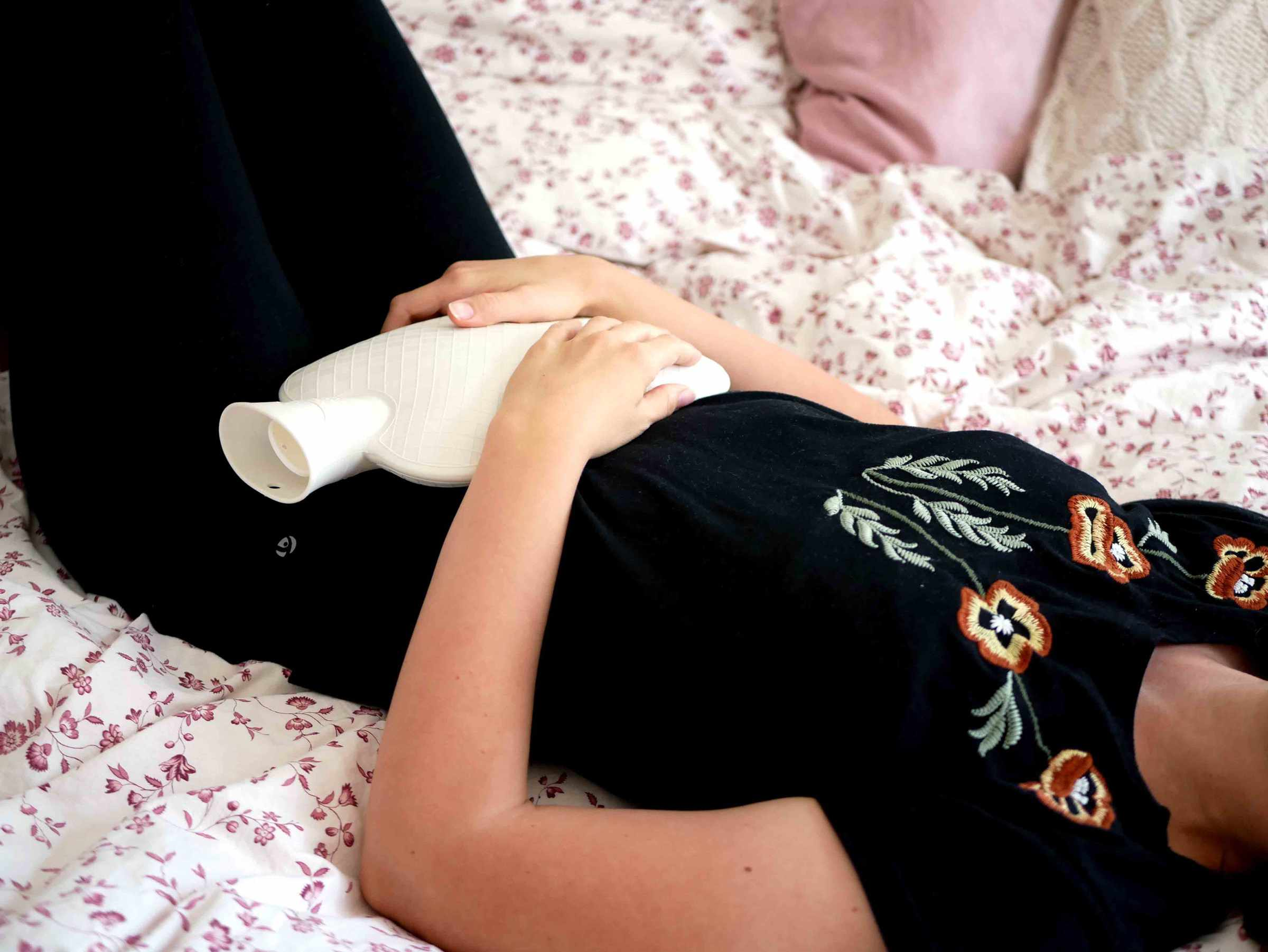
Pain relief using a hot water bottle

While generally used for keeping warm, conventional hot-water bottles can be used to some effect for the local application of heat as a medical treatment, for example for period pain relief, but newer items such as purpose-designed heating pads are often used now.

== Regulation ==
The United Kingdom defined British Standards for hot-water bottles to regulate their manufacture and sale as well as to ensure their compliance with all safety standards. The British Standards BS 1970 and BS 1970:2012 (updated version) define, for instance, the bottles’ filling characteristics, safety instructions, allowed materials and components as well as testing methods such as tensile tests for PVC bottles.

== Electric hot water bottle ==
An electric hot water bottle is a heat therapy device that uses electrical energy to warm water inside a sealed bag. It typically features a heating element and insulation to retain heat, providing warmth for relieving muscle pain. It was first invented by Chen Juncheng and Liu Rongren in China.

== Problems ==
There have been problems with premature failure of rubber hot-water bottles due to faulty manufacture. The rubber may fail strength or fitness tests, or become brittle if manufacturing is not controlled closely. Natural rubber filled with calcium carbonate is the most common material used, but is susceptible to oxidation and polymer degradation at the high temperatures used in shaping the product. Even though the brittle cracks may not be visible externally, the bottle can fracture suddenly after filling with hot water, and can scald the user—sometimes requiring hospitalization for severe burn cases.

Boiling water is not recommended for use in hot-water bottles. This is due to risks of the rubber being degraded from high-temperature water, and the risk of injury in case of breakage.

Hot water bottle rash (Erythema ab igne) is a skin condition caused by long-term exposure to heat (infrared radiation) or excessive use of a hot water bottle.

== See also ==
- Hot water bottle blowing
- Bed warmer - or warming pan, a common household item in countries with cold winters which utilises hot ashes.
- Electric blanket - a blanket that contains integrated electrical heating.
