= Cold-energy battery =

A cold-energy battery utilizes the properties of an advanced phase-change material (PCM) to maintain temperature as battery thermal management. As with a standard electrical battery, a cold energy battery stores energy and releases depending on the energy demand on it. It can then be recharged by placing in a temperature environment conducive to the phase change properties of the PCM.

In the context of a cold-energy battery, these materials are used to store "cold" energy, which can be particularly useful in cooling and refrigeration applications.

The energy released/absorbed by phase transition from solid to liquid, or vice versa, the heat of fusion is generally much higher than the sensible heat. Ice, for example, requires 333.55 J/g to melt, but then the water will rise one degree further with the addition of just 4.18 J/g.
