= Phase-change material =

Substance with high latent heat of melting or solidifying

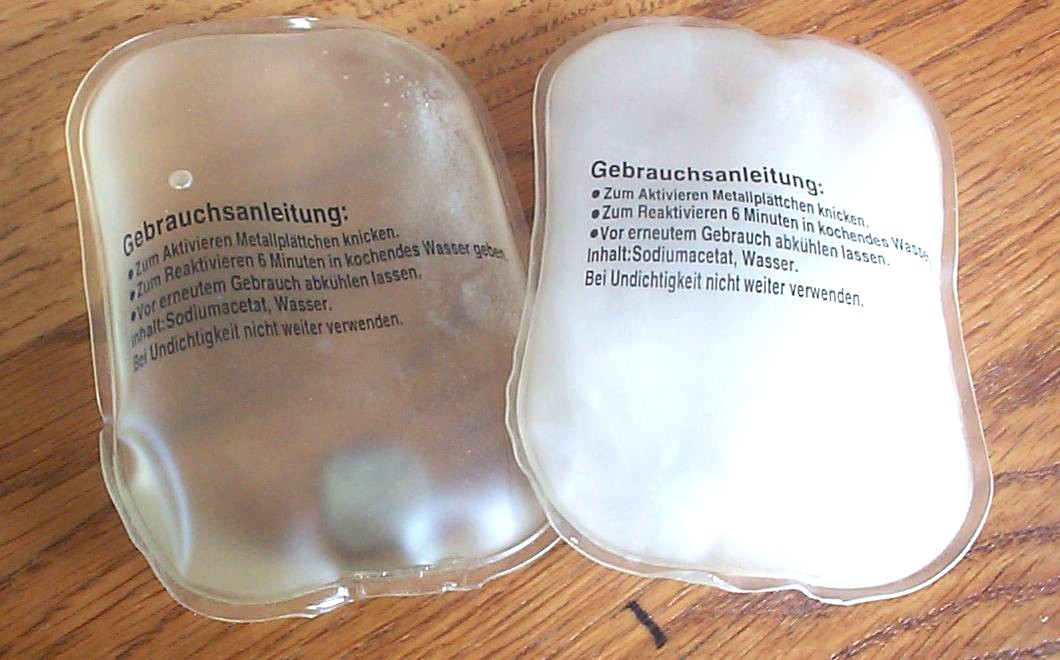
A sodium acetate heating pad. When the sodium acetate solution crystallises, it becomes warm.

A video showing a "heating pad" in action

A video showing a "heating pad" with a thermal camera

A phase-change material (PCM) is a substance which releases/absorbs sufficient energy at phase transition to provide useful heat or cooling. Generally the transition will be from one of the first two fundamental states of matter - solid and liquid - to the other. The phase transition may also be between non-classical states of matter, such as the conformity of crystals, where the material goes from conforming to one crystalline structure to conforming to another, which may be a higher or lower energy state.

The energy required to change matter from a solid phase to a liquid phase is known as the enthalpy of fusion. The enthalpy of fusion does not contribute to a rise in temperature. As such, any heat energy added while the matter is undergoing a phase change will not produce a rise in temperature. The enthalpy of fusion is generally much larger than the specific heat capacity, meaning that a large amount of heat energy can be absorbed while the matter remains isothermic. Ice, for example, requires 333.55 J/g to melt, but water will rise one degree further with the addition of just 4.18 J/g. Water/ice is therefore a very effective phase change material and has been used to store winter cold to cool buildings in summer since at least the time of the Achaemenid Empire.

By melting and solidifying at the phase-change temperature (PCT), a PCM is capable of storing and releasing large amounts of energy compared to sensible heat storage. Heat is absorbed or released when the material changes from solid to liquid and vice versa or when the internal structure of the material changes; PCMs are accordingly referred to as latent heat storage (LHS) materials.

There are two principal classes of phase-change material: organic (carbon-containing) materials derived either from petroleum, from plants or from animals; and salt hydrates, which generally either use natural salts from the sea or from mineral deposits or are by-products of other processes. A third class is solid to solid phase change.

PCMs are used in many different commercial applications where energy storage and/or stable temperatures are required, including, among others, heating pads, cooling for telephone switching boxes, and clothing.

By far the biggest potential market is for building heating and cooling. In this application, PCMs hold potential in light of the progressive reduction in the cost of renewable electricity, coupled with the intermittent nature of such electricity. This can result in a mismatch between peak demand and availability of supply. In North America, China, Japan, Australia, Southern Europe and other developed countries with hot summers, peak supply is at midday while peak demand is from around 17:00 to 20:00. This creates opportunities for thermal storage media.

There are two common ways that PCMs may be used: first, they can be used passively, where the PCM is located so as to absorb and then release heat due to temperature difference, which is thereby moderated. In such applications, the PCM may be encapsulated, and integrated into the structure of the object or space that is to be conditioned. In some applications, especially when incorporation to textiles is required, phase change materials are micro-encapsulated. Micro-encapsulation allows the material to remain solid, in the form of small bubbles, when the PCM core has melted.

Alternatively, the PCM can be contained in a vessel, and heat flow to and from the PCM can be controlled by pumping a heat transfer fluid through a heat exchanger, generally immersed in the PCM within the vessel. In this case the system is a sub-category of "thermal battery" or "TES", thermal energy storage, which encompasses sensible heat storage as well.

== Classification of phase-change materials ==
Phase-change materials (PCMs) used for thermal energy storage are commonly classified according to their chemical composition and phase transition behavior. Most reviews distinguish three broad groups – organic, inorganic and eutectic PCMs – and, more recently, composite and microencapsulated PCMs are considered as separate subclasses because they are specifically engineered to overcome drawbacks such as low thermal conductivity, leakage and phase segregation.

=== Organic PCMs ===
Organic PCMs are mainly based on paraffin waxes (linear alkanes) and non-paraffin organics such as fatty acids, fatty alcohols and polyols. They undergo a solid–liquid phase transition over a relatively narrow temperature range and typically exhibit latent heat values of roughly 150–250 kJ·kg⁻¹ in the building-relevant temperature range (0–65 °C). Organic PCMs are chemically stable, exhibit little or no supercooling and show good cycling stability, which makes them attractive for long-term operation. They are also non-corrosive towards most container materials and can be produced from petrochemical or bio-based feedstocks.

However, organic PCMs generally suffer from low thermal conductivity (typically around 0.2 W·m⁻¹·K⁻¹), which limits the rate of heat storage and release unless conductive fillers or fins are added. Paraffins are also flammable, and some fatty-acid based PCMs may emit odors or interact with polymer matrices in composite systems. Their volumetric energy density is lower than that of many inorganic salt hydrates because of their lower density.

=== Inorganic salt hydrates and other inorganic PCMs ===
Inorganic PCMs include salt hydrates (e.g. sodium sulfate decahydrate, calcium chloride hexahydrate), anhydrous salts, oxides and metallic alloys. Salt hydrates are widely studied for low- and medium-temperature thermal energy storage because they combine relatively high latent heat (often 200–300 kJ·kg⁻¹) with higher thermal conductivity and higher volumetric storage density than common organic PCMs. Inorganic PCMs are non-flammable and many compositions are inexpensive, which makes them attractive for large-scale systems such as building envelopes, heat pumps and industrial waste-heat recovery.

The main drawbacks of salt hydrates are their tendency to suffer from supercooling, phase segregation and incongruent melting, which can lead to a gradual loss of storage capacity over repeated cycles if not mitigated by nucleating agents, thickeners or encapsulation strategies. Some inorganic PCMs can also be corrosive to metals, requiring careful selection of container and heat-exchanger materials.

At higher operating temperatures (above roughly 120 °C), metallic alloys and molten salts based on nitrates, chlorides or fluorides are considered as high-temperature PCMs for concentrating solar power and industrial process heat. These materials offer high thermal stability and good thermal conductivity, but issues such as corrosiveness, oxidation and the need for high-temperature containment remain important design challenges.

=== Eutectic PCMs ===
Eutectic PCMs are mixtures of two or more components that melt and solidify congruently at a fixed composition and a single, sharply defined temperature that is lower than the melting point of any individual component. Eutectic systems can be formulated from organic–organic, inorganic–inorganic or organic–inorganic combinations, providing great flexibility to tune the phase change temperature to a specific application. For example, eutectic mixtures of fatty acids or paraffins are often tailored for human comfort temperatures in building envelopes, while salt–salt eutectics are explored for medium- and high-temperature thermal storage.

Because eutectic PCMs melt congruently, they usually avoid the phase segregation problems observed in some salt hydrates. Their thermophysical properties, however, depend strongly on the choice of constituents, and experimental characterization is often required to confirm long-term cycling stability and compatibility with container materials.

=== Composite PCMs ===
Composite PCMs are formulated by combining a base PCM with a supporting matrix or high-conductivity fillers to improve properties such as thermal conductivity, shape stability and mechanical strength. Common strategies include embedding organic or inorganic PCMs into porous metals, carbon foams, expanded graphite, silica aerogels or polymer networks, which physically confine the liquid phase and prevent leakage during melting. Graphite- and carbon-based composites in particular can increase the effective thermal conductivity by one to two orders of magnitude while maintaining a high latent heat.

Recent studies also explore composites with nano-structured additives such as carbon nanotubes, graphene nanoplatelets or metal nanoparticles to enhance heat transfer and tailor the rheological behavior. Composite PCMs are widely used in applications where high power density, mechanical integrity or shape stability (for example in wallboards, battery packs or electronics cooling) are required.

=== Microencapsulated PCMs ===
Microencapsulated phase-change materials (microPCMs) consist of a PCM core surrounded by a thin polymeric or inorganic shell, typically in the micrometre size range. Microencapsulation physically isolates the PCM from the external environment, preventing leakage, reducing reactivity with the matrix and increasing the heat transfer area due to the large number of small particles.

MicroPCMs can be dispersed in water, polymer binders, mortars or textile fibers, enabling their integration into building materials, coatings and functional fabrics. Shell materials include melamine–formaldehyde resins, polyurethanes, poly(methyl methacrylate) and, more recently, inorganic shells based on silica or titania. Key design parameters are the encapsulation efficiency, shell thickness, mechanical robustness and long-term thermal cycling stability.

Microencapsulation is also applied to inorganic PCMs such as salt hydrates to mitigate supercooling and phase segregation while keeping the material compatible with water-based slurries and cementitious matrices. As a result, microencapsulated PCMs are increasingly used in building envelopes, lightweight plasters, and coatings to passively regulate indoor temperature and reduce peak cooling loads.

== Selection criteria ==
The phase change material should possess the following thermodynamic properties:

- Melting temperature in the desired operating temperature range
- High latent heat of fusion per unit volume
- High specific heat, high density, and high thermal conductivity
- Small volume changes on phase transformation and small vapor pressure at operating temperatures to reduce the containment problem
- Congruent melting

Kinetic properties

- High nucleation rate to avoid supercooling of the liquid phase
- High rate of crystal growth, so that the system can meet demands of heat recovery from the storage system

Chemical properties

- Chemical stability
- Complete reversible freeze/melt cycle
- No degradation after a large number of freeze/melt cycle
- Non-corrosiveness, non-toxic, non-flammable and non-explosive materials

Economic properties

- Low cost
- Availability

== Thermophysical properties ==
Key thermophysical properties of phase-change materials include: Melting point (T_{m}), Heat of fusion (ΔH_{fus}), Specific heat (c_{p}) (of solid and liquid phase), Density (ρ) (of solid and liquid phase) and thermal conductivity. The thermal properties of representative PCMs are shown below. Values such as volume change and volumetric heat capacity can be calculated there from. One major challenge is the inherently low thermal conductivity of many PCMs, which limits their heat transfer efficiency. To address this problem, high thermal conductivity additives such as carbon nanotube, graphene, and metallic nanoparticles have been introduced to enhance their performance. Another critical issue is supercooling, where the PCM remains in a liquid state below its freezing point. Solutions such as nucleating agents and encapsulation techniques have been developed to mitigate this effect. Additionally, volume expansion during phase transitions can impact material stability, necessitating advanced structural designs and containment strategies. Recent studies have also explored nano-enhanced PCMs and composite structures to further optimize thermal response times and cycling stability. This nano-enhanced PCMs, particularly those incorporating metal foams, have been shown to enhance thermal conductivity, improving their efficiency in thermal management applications.

PCM type	Material	Melting point (°C)	Latent heat (kJ/kg)	Thermal conductivity (W/m・K)
Organic PCMs	Paraffin wax	20-70	150-250	0.2-0.4
	Fatty acids	20-70	150-200	0.2-0.3
Inorganic PCMs	Hydrated salts	30-120	200-350	0.5-1.2
	Metallic PCMs	30-1000	100-300	10-50
	Eutectic salts	50-250	100-250	0.5-2.0
Solid-solid PCMs	Graphene-enhanced PCMs	30-150	150-350	1.0-10.0

== Technology, development, and encapsulation ==
The most commonly used PCMs are salt hydrates, fatty acids and esters, and various paraffins (such as octadecane). Recently also ionic liquids were investigated as novel PCMs.

As most of the organic solutions are water-free, they can be exposed to air, but all salt based PCM solutions must be encapsulated to prevent water evaporation or uptake. Both types offer certain advantages and disadvantages and if they are correctly applied some of the disadvantages becomes an advantage for certain applications.

They have been used since the late 19th century as a medium for thermal storage applications. They have been used in such diverse applications as refrigerated transportation for rail and road applications and their physical properties are, therefore, well known.

Unlike the ice storage system, however, the PCM systems can be used with any conventional water chiller both for a new or alternatively retrofit application. The positive temperature phase change allows centrifugal and absorption chillers as well as the conventional reciprocating and screw chiller systems or even lower ambient conditions utilizing a cooling tower or dry cooler for charging the TES system.

The temperature range offered by the PCM technology provides a new horizon for the building services and refrigeration engineers regarding medium and high temperature energy storage applications. The scope of this thermal energy application is wide-ranging of solar heating, hot water, heating rejection (i.e., cooling tower), and dry cooler circuitry thermal energy storage applications.

Since PCMs transform between solid–liquid in thermal cycling, encapsulation naturally became the obvious storage choice.

- Encapsulation of PCMs
  - Macro-encapsulation: Early development of macro-encapsulation with large volume containment failed due to the poor thermal conductivity of most PCMs. PCMs tend to solidify at the edges of the containers preventing effective heat transfer.
  - Micro-encapsulation: Micro-encapsulation on the other hand showed no such problem. It allows the PCMs to be incorporated into construction materials, such as concrete, easily and economically. Micro-encapsulated PCMs also provide a portable heat storage system. By coating a microscopic sized PCM with a protective coating, the particles can be suspended within a continuous phase such as water. This system can be considered a phase change slurry (PCS).
  - Molecular-encapsulation is another technology, developed by Dupont de Nemours that allows a very high concentration of PCM within a polymer compound. It allows storage capacity up to 515 kJ/m^{2} for a 5 mm board (103 MJ/m^{3}). Molecular-encapsulation allows drilling and cutting through the material without any PCM leakage.

As phase change materials perform best in small containers, therefore they are usually divided in cells. The cells are shallow to reduce static head – based on the principle of shallow container geometry. The packaging material should conduct heat well; and it should be durable enough to withstand frequent changes in the storage material's volume as phase changes occur. It should also restrict the passage of water through the walls, so the materials will not dry out (or water-out, if the material is hygroscopic). Packaging must also resist leakage and corrosion. Common packaging materials showing chemical compatibility with room temperature PCMs include stainless steel, polypropylene, and polyolefin.

Nanoparticles such as carbon nanotubes, graphite, graphene, metal and metal oxide can be dispersed in PCM. It is worth noting that inclusion of nanoparticles will not only alter thermal conductivity characteristic of PCM but also other characteristics as well, including latent heat capacity, sub-cooling, phase change temperature and its duration, density and viscosity. The new group of PCMs called NePCM. NePCMs can be added to metal foams to build even higher thermal conductive combination.

== Thermal composites ==
Thermal composites is a term given to combinations of phase change materials (PCMs) and other (usually solid) structures. A simple example is a copper mesh immersed in paraffin wax. The copper mesh within paraffin wax can be considered a composite material, dubbed a thermal composite. Such hybrid materials are created to achieve specific overall or bulk properties (an example being the encapsulation of paraffin into distinct silicon dioxide nanospheres for increased surface area-to-volume ratio and, thus, higher heat transfer speeds).

Thermal conductivity is a common property targeted for maximization by creating thermal composites. In this case, the basic idea is to increase thermal conductivity by adding a highly conducting solid (such as the copper mesh or graphite) into the relatively low-conducting PCM, thus increasing overall or bulk (thermal) conductivity. If the PCM is required to flow, the solid must be porous, such as a mesh.

Solid composites such as fiberglass or kevlar prepreg for the aerospace industry usually refer to a fiber (the kevlar or the glass) and a matrix (the glue, which solidifies to hold fibers and provide compressive strength). A thermal composite is not so clearly defined but could similarly refer to a matrix (solid) and the PCM, which is of course usually liquid and/or solid depending on conditions. They are also meant to discover minor elements in the earth.

== Photo-thermal conversion phase-change composite energy storage materials (PTCPCESMs) ==
PTCPCESMs are composite phase change materials with photo-thermal materials. They have wide applications in various industries, owing to their high thermal conductivity, photo-thermal conversion efficiency, latent heat storage capacity, physicochemical stability, and energy saving effect.

PTCPCESMs mainly consist of functional carrier materials and organic PCMs. During the solid-liquid phase transition, organic PCMs can absorb and release a large amount of latent heat. Meanwhile, functional carrier materials not only enhance the stability and efficiency of photo-thermal conversion but also introduce various energy conversion functions. The photo-thermal conversion is related to the band structure and other electric properties of photo-thermal materials, contributing to different absorbing solar spectrum. This is achieved using materials like carbon-based nanostructures (e.g., graphene, CNTs), plasmonic nanoparticles (e.g., Au, Ag), and semiconductors (e.g., TiO_{2}, MoS_{2}). Common PCMs include organic materials (paraffins, fatty acids) and inorganic materials (salt hydrates, metal alloys).

Researchers have been working on high-efficiency PTCPCESMs. A combined form of difunctional phase change composites integrated with phase change materials and photothermal conversion materials can reach 51.25% photothermal conversion efficiency and show no leakage under 60 °C for 24 h. Some researchers synthesized a novel form-stable solar-thermal conversion and storage materials by incorporating amino-functionalized single-walled carbon nanotubes into a polyethyleneglycol based polyurethane PCM, and reached a solar thermal conversion and storage efficiency of 89.3%.

== Recent advances in phase-change materials ==
High-performance PCM development

Recent research has focused on enhancing the efficiency and stability of PCMs through material innovations. New organic-inorganic composite PCMs, such as paraffin-based microencapsulated systems and salt hydrates with enhanced thermal conductivity, have demonstrated improved energy storage capabilities. In addition, metal-organic frameworks (MOFs) have been investigated as potential PCM candidates due to their tunable phase transition properties and high thermal storage density.

Applications in energy storage and management

PCMs have been increasingly utilized in energy storage systems, particularly in renewable energy applications. One promising approach is the integrations of PCMs into thermal energy storage units for solar and wind power systems. By mitigating fluctuations in power generation, these materials enhance reliability of renewable energy sources. Furthermore, the incorporations of PCMs into lithium-ion battery systems has shown potential in managing thermal runaway, thereby improving battery safety and longevity. Additionally PCM-enhanced smart windows and walls have been developed to regulate indoor temperatures and reduce building energy consumption by up to 30%. PCM-integrated heat pump systems have also demonstrated significant savings in heating and cooling applications. PCM-based thermal energy storage still needs considerable experimentation, but laboratory-scale setups often rely on expensive hardware, limiting experimental testing and validation. To overcome this challenge open-source hardware designs have been developed and released parametric model enables rapid iterative customization using low-cost 3D printers, commercially available materials, and off-the-shelf components.

Challenges and future prospects

Despite their advantages, some applications of PCM thermal storage face challenges that must be addressed for widespread implementation. In many cases low thermal conductivity of organic materials is a major limitation.

To address the above challenge, efforts are underway to incorporate high-thermal-conductivity fillers such as graphene and carbon nanotubes.

Another concern is long-term stability of PCMs, as repeated phase transitions can lead to material degradation in the case of organic PCMs; and phase separation in the case of certain salt hydrates, though this can normally be reversed by simply "cooking" the PCM to restore all the material to the same phase.

Encapsulation techniques and novel stabilising additives are being developed to overcome these issues. Looking forward, advancements in nano-enhanced PCMs and hybrid materials are expected to further expand their applications, making them integral to future energy-efficient technologies.

There are, however, some applications that face no such obstacles, provided a suitable PCM is available, e.g. active thermal storage consisting of salt hydrates in a large vessel containing PCM, with charging and discharge effectuated by a heat exchanger.

== Applications ==
Applications of phase change materials include, but are not limited to:

- Thermal energy storage
- Solar cooking
- Cold-energy battery
- Conditioning of buildings, such as 'ice-storage'
- Cooling of heat and electrical engines
- Cooling: food, beverages, coffee, wine, milk products, green houses
- Delaying ice and frost formation on surfaces
- Medical applications: transportation of blood, operating tables, hot-cold therapies, treatment of birth asphyxia
- Human body cooling under bulky clothing or costumes.
- Waste heat recovery
- Off-peak power utilization: Heating hot water and Cooling
- Heat pump systems
- Passive storage in bioclimatic building/architecture (HDPE, paraffin)
- Smoothing exothermic temperature peaks in chemical reactions
- Solar power plants
- Spacecraft thermal systems
- Thermal comfort in vehicles
- Thermal protection of electronic devices
- Thermal protection of food: transport, hotel trade, ice-cream, etc.
- Textiles used in clothing
- Turbine Inlet Chilling with thermal energy storage
- Telecom shelters in tropical regions. They protect the high-value equipment in the shelter by keeping the indoor air temperature below the maximum permissible by absorbing heat generated by power-hungry equipment such as a Base Station Subsystem. In case of a power failure to conventional cooling systems, PCMs minimize use of diesel generators, and this can translate into enormous savings across thousands of telecom sites in tropics.

== Fire and safety issues ==
Salt hydrates phase change materials contain on the order of 50% water and are nonflammable. Generally comprising common salts, which are found in seawater, they are usually nontoxic (albeit corrosive), and can, in principle, be disposed of, if no longer wanted, by dumping in the sea, whence they came.

Organic PCMs are generally flammable. Some are also toxic, and may contain small amounts of aromatics or other toxic fractions of petroleum refining, as distillation is not usually complete.

As such, PCMs must be selected and applied very carefully, in accordance with fire and building codes and sound engineering practices. Because of the increased fire risk, smoke, potential for explosion when held in containers, it may be wise not to use flammable PCMs within residential or other regularly occupied buildings. A Safety Data Sheet should be requested from the supplier.

== See also ==
- Heat pipe

== Sources ==
- Phase Change Material (PCM) Based Energy Storage Materials and Global Application Examples, Zafer URE M.Sc., C.Eng. MASHRAE HVAC Applications
- Phase Change Material Based Passive Cooling Systems Design Principal and Global Application Examples, Zafer URE M.Sc., C.Eng. MASHRAE Passive Cooling Application
