= Heating pad =

Pad used for warming of parts of the body in order to manage pain

A heating pad is a pad used for warming of parts of the body in order to manage pain. Localized application of heat causes the blood vessels in that area to dilate, enhancing perfusion to the targeted tissue. Types of heating pads include electrical, chemical and hot water bottles.

Specialized heating pads (mats) are also used in other settings. Heat mats in plant propagation stimulate seed germination and root development; they operate at cooler temperatures. Heat mats also are available in the pet trade, especially as warming spots for reptiles such as lizards and snakes.

== Types ==
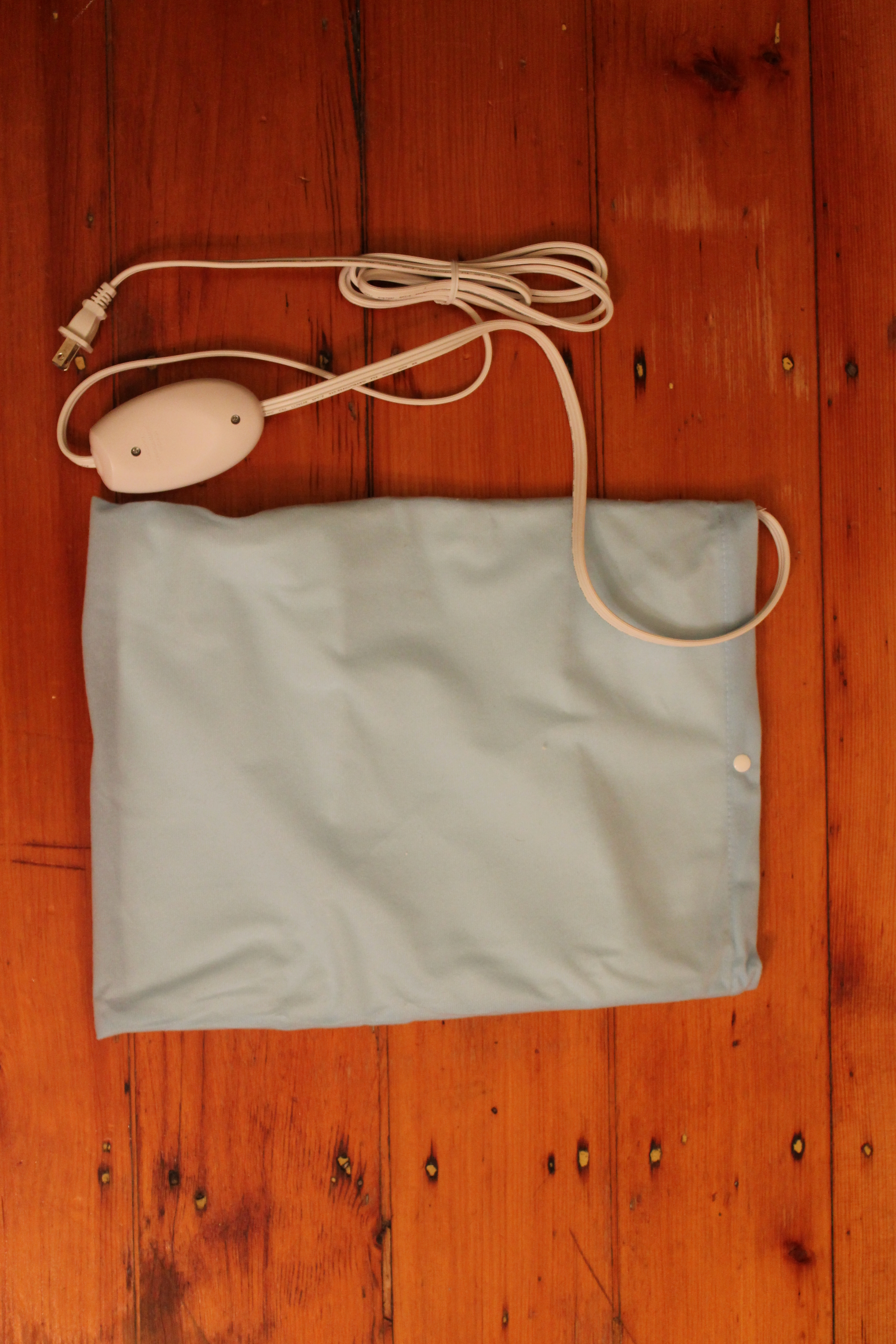
An electric heating pad

=== Electrical ===
Electric pads usually operate from household current and must have protection against overheating.

A moist heating pad is used damp on the user's skin. These pads register temperatures from 76 to 82 °C (169 to 180 °F) and are intended for deep tissue treatment and can be dangerous if left on unattended. Moist heating pads are used mainly by physical therapists but can be found for home use. A moist cloth can be added with a stupe cover to add more moisture to the treatment.

An electric heating pouch is similar in form to an electric heating pad but is curved to wrap around a joint.

Retail heating pads in the U.S.A. have a time-out function at two hours.

=== Chemical ===
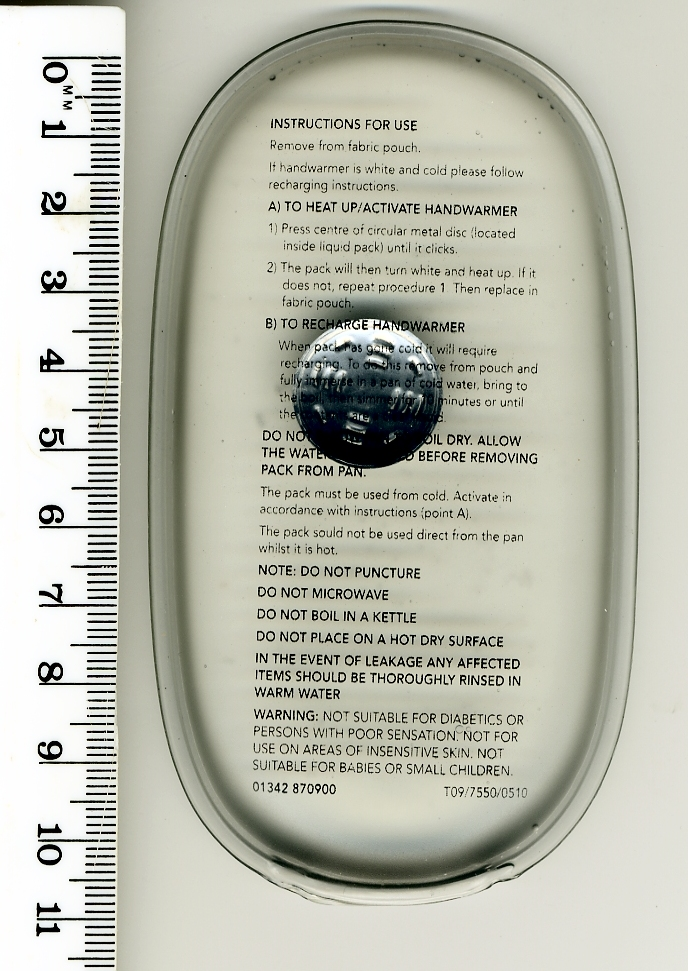
A sodium acetate heat pad

Disposable chemical pads employ a one-time exothermic chemical reaction. One type, frequently used for hand warmers, is triggered by unwrapping an air-tight packet containing slightly moist iron powder and salt or catalysts which rusts over a period of hours after being exposed to oxygen in the air. Another type contains separate compartments within the pad; when the user squeezes the pad, a barrier ruptures and the compartments mix, producing heat such as the enthalpy change of solution of calcium chloride dissolving.

The most common reusable heat pads contain a supersaturated solution of sodium acetate in water. Crystallization is triggered by flexing a small flat disc of notched ferrous metal embedded in the liquid. Pressing the disc releases very tiny adhered crystals of sodium acetate into the solution which then act as nucleation sites for the crystallization of the sodium acetate into the hydrated salt (sodium acetate trihydrate, CH_{3}COONa · 3 H_{2}O). Because the liquid is supersaturated, this causes the solution to begin to crystallize over a few seconds, typically by propagating from the initial nucleation site and eventually causing the entire contained liquid to solidify, thereby releasing the thermal energy of the crystal lattice. The use of the metal disc was invented in 1978.

The pad can be reused by placing it in boiling water for a few minutes, which redissolves the sodium acetate trihydrate in the contained water and reconstites a supersaturated solution. Once the pad has returned to room temperature it can be triggered again. Triggering the pad before it has reached room temperature results in the pad reaching a lower peak temperature, as compared to waiting until it had completely cooled. This process can be repeated indefinitely.

== High specific-heat capacity materials ==
Heating packs can also be made by filling a container with a material that has a high specific heat capacity, which then gradually releases the heat over time. A hot water bottle is the most familiar example of this type of heating pad.

A microwavable heating pad is a heating pad that is warmed by placing it in a microwave oven before use. Microwavable heating pads are typically made out of a thick insulative fabric such as flannel and filled with grains such as wheat, buckwheat or flax seed. Due to their relative simplicity to make, they are frequently sewn by hand, often with a custom shape to fit the intended area of use.

Often, aromatic compounds will also be added to the filler mixture to create a pleasant or soothing smell when heated. The source of these can vary significantly, ranging from adding essential oils to ground-up spices such as cloves and nutmeg, or even dried rose petals.

=== Phase-change materials ===
Phase change materials can be used for heating pads intended to operate at a fixed temperature. The heat of fusion is used to release thermal energy. This results in the pad heating up.

== Function ==
Many episodes of pain come from muscle exertion or strain, which creates tension in the muscles and soft tissues. This tension can constrict circulation, sending pain signals to the brain. Heat application eases pain by:

- dilating the blood vessels surrounding the painful area. Increased blood flow provides additional oxygen and nutrients to help heal the damaged muscle tissue.
- stimulating sensation in the skin and therefore decreasing the pain signals being transmitted to the brain
- increasing the flexibility (and decreasing painful stiffness) of soft tissues surrounding the injured area, including muscles and connective tissue.

As many heating pads are portable, heat may be applied as needed at home, at work, or while travelling. Some physicians recommend alternating heat and ice for pain relief.

== See also ==
- Hand warmer
- Ice pack § Instant ice packs
