= Posterior motion preservation devices =

Spinal implants designed to preserve lumbar motion after posterior decompression

Posterior motion preservation devices are spinal implants used in lumbar spine surgery to stabilize a motion segment after posterior decompression while attempting to preserve various degrees of segmental movement. They are used as alternatives to rigid spinal fusion in selected patients with degenerative lumbar conditions such as spinal stenosis and low-grade spondylolisthesis.

Posterior motion preservation systems emerged as alternatives to rigid lumbar fusion, with the goal of avoiding rigid fixation while maintaining neural decompression and segmental stability.

These devices include interspinous and interlaminar implants, pedicle-based dynamic stabilization systems, posterior tension-band systems, posterior facet or posterior element replacement systems, and posterior total joint replacement systems.

== Classification ==
Category	Description	Examples
Interlaminar implants	Devices placed between laminae to limit extension after decompression	Coflex
Interspinous implants	Devices placed between spinous processes to limit extension with or without decompression	DIAM
Pedicle-based dynamic stabilization systems	Pedicle screw-based constructs with connecting flexible elements rather than fully rigid rods	Dynesys, HPS
Posterior tension-band systems	Devices intended to provide posterior sagittal support without fusion	LimiFlex
Posterior facet or posterior element replacement systems	Implants designed to replace posterior stabilizing and articulating structures to preserve full physiological segmental motion	TOPS
Total joint replacement systems	Implants designed to reconstruct the entire motion segment, including disc and facet function	MOTUS

== Rationale ==
Lumbar fusion is commonly performed after decompression is performed to address spinal instability or degenerative spondylolisthesis. However, fusion eliminates motion at the treated segment and may increase mechanical stress at adjacent levels. Posterior motion preservation devices were developed to provide stabilization while maintaining some degree of segmental motion at the operated level.

The theoretical goals include reduction of back and leg symptoms, maintenance of foraminal or canal space, preservation of segmental motion, and reduction of adjacent segment degeneration. Clinical evidence varies substantially between device classes.

Biomechanical studies of early posterior dynamic stabilization systems reported altered segmental load transfer and motion patterns compared with native spinal biomechanics. Several newer motion-preservation and posterior joint-replacement systems were developed after publication of many of these studies. Recent reviews distinguish facet and posterior-element replacement from other posterior motion-preservation approaches because these systems are intended to restore stability after decompression while retaining segmental motion. The reviews identify motion preservation and the potential reduction of adjacent-segment disease as proposed advantages, while emphasizing careful patient selection and the need for long-term durability data.

Different device classes reflect varying approaches to balancing decompression, spinal stability, and preservation of motion, and may be applied to different patient populations depending on pathology and surgical requirements. The relationship between these approaches and representative device categories is summarized below.

Approach	Device category	Representative devices
Decompression alone	No implant	–
Spinal fusion	Rigid fixation	Pedicle screw systems with interbody fusion
Facet replacement	Posterior facet or posterior element replacement systems	TOPS
Total joint replacement	Total spinal segment replacement systems	MOTUS
Dynamic stabilization systems	Pedicle-based dynamic systems	HPS, Dynesys
Dynamic sagittal tether band	Posterior tension-band systems	LimiFlex
Interspinous devices	Interspinous process motion devices	DIAM
Interlaminar devices	Interlaminar motion devices	Coflex

The theoretical characteristics of these approaches are summarized below.

Approach	Core concept	Clinical objective	Advantages (theoretical)	Limitations (theoretical)
Decompression alone	Removal of neural compression without instrumentation	Relief of neural impingement and radicular symptoms	Directly addresses nerve compression; Least invasive surgical approach; Preserves native anatomy and motion	May not address underlying segmental instability; Extensive decompression can destabilize the motion segment; May be insufficient in cases requiring wide decompression or involving spondylolisthesis; Risk of symptom recurrence or reoperation in unstable cases
Interspinous and interlaminar devices; Dynamic Sagittal Tether Band	Use of rigid construct to limit extension. Interspinous labelling calls for decompression that is not destabilizing. Interlaminar labelling does not allow decompression. Dynamic Sagittal Tether uses flexible construct to limit flexion. Labelling calls for decompression that is not destabilizing. Use of posterior implants to limit motion while avoiding fusion. Interlaminar stabilization is performed after decompression, while preserving sufficient posterior stability. Interspinous and posterior tension-band systems generally require posterior elements suitable for fixation and avoidance of destabilizing decompression.	Reduce pathological motion while avoiding rigid fusion	Less rigid than fusion; May reduce load on discs and facet joints; Conceptually preserves partial motion	Does not fully replicate normal spinal biomechanics; Variable clinical outcomes reported in the literature; Risk of implant-related complications, including fracture of spinous process and lamina
Dynamic Stabilization Systems	Use of flexible constructs to limit, but not eliminate motion. Labelling requires decompression that is not destabilizing Use of flexible constructs to limit, but not eliminate, motion. Device labeling generally requires decompression that does not create segmental instability.	Reduce pathological motion while avoiding rigid fusion	Less rigid than fusion; May reduce load on discs and facet joints; Preserves partial physiologic motion in flexion-extension; not in lateral bending or axial rotation	Does not fully replicate normal spinal biomechanics; Variable clinical outcomes reported in the literature; Risk of implant-related complications, including screw loosening or mechanical failure
Facet Replacement Systems and Total Joint Replacement systems	Stabilization while maintaining physiological segmental motion after wide (up to pedicle-to-pedicle) decompression	Maintain segmental motion while controlling instability	Preserves motion at the treated level; Reduces stress on adjacent segments; Addresses instability without rigid fixation	Technically more complex; Long-term durability varies between systems; Requires careful patient selection; PMA study proves facet replacement superiority to fusion and supported by FDA labelling; Total Joint Replacement still under FDA review
Spinal Fusion Systems	Rigid fixation to eliminate motion at the treated segment	Stabilization of unstable segments and prevention of pathological motion	Provides strong and predictable stabilization; Well-established technique with extensive clinical experience; Effective for unstable spondylolisthesis and severe degeneration	Eliminates segmental motion; Risk of adjacent segment degeneration; Pseudoarthrosis; Implant-related complications and longer recovery; Persistent or new back pain has been reported in some patients following fusion, even after radiographic fusion is achieved

== Interspinous and interlaminar devices ==
=== DIAM ===
The Device for Intervertebral Assisted Motion (DIAM) is an interspinous stabilization implant designed to limit extension and unload posterior spinal elements following decompression. It has also been used adjacent to spinal fusion constructs in an attempt to reduce adjacent segment degeneration.

The implant consists of a silicone elastomer core covered by a polyester mesh and secured between adjacent spinous processes using tethering bands. The device was developed to provide flexible posterior stabilization while preserving partial segmental motion.

Biomechanical studies of DIAM and other interspinous implants have shown that these devices mainly stabilize the treated segment in extension, with more limited effects in flexion, lateral bending, and axial rotation. Finite-element analysis of DIAM after minimally invasive decompression also reported altered range of motion and stress redistribution at posterior elements.

Clinical evidence for DIAM has been mixed. Some observational and randomized studies reported improvements in pain and disability, while other studies reported variable durability and reoperation rates. A randomized study of DIAM for lumbar degenerative disc disease compared the implant with non-operative treatment, with crossover permitted after six months.

A systematic review and meta-analysis comparing interspinous process spacers with traditional decompression for lumbar spinal stenosis reported that the use of interspinous spacers remained controversial, particularly because of higher reoperation rates despite some perioperative advantages.

Long-term superiority over fusion or decompression-based surgical approaches has not been consistently demonstrated, and reported complications included recurrent stenosis, recurrent disc herniation, post-laminectomy spondylolisthesis, implant-related issues, and conversion to fusion surgery in some patients.

In 2025, the DIAM Spinal Stabilization System received U.S. Food and Drug Administration (FDA) premarket approval for treatment of moderate to severe primary low back pain associated with single-level degenerative disc disease from L2 to L5 in patients who remained symptomatic after at least six months of non-operative treatment.

Although use of DIAM declined in some regions over time, the system contributed to the development of posterior dynamic stabilization and motion-preservation concepts in lumbar spine surgery.

=== Coflex ===
Coflex is an interlaminar stabilization device designed to provide dynamic posterior stabilization following decompression for lumbar spinal stenosis. It is placed between adjacent laminae and used as an alternative to fusion in selected patients.

Coflex has been evaluated in prospective randomized controlled trials. In a multicenter U.S. Food and Drug Administration (FDA) investigational device exemption trial, decompression with Coflex was compared with decompression and fusion in patients with lumbar spinal stenosis and up to Grade I degenerative spondylolisthesis.

Five-year follow-up demonstrated sustained improvements in pain and disability in both Coflex and fusion groups, with similar reoperation rates. The Coflex group experienced shorter operative times, reduced blood loss, and shorter hospital stays compared with fusion.

Long-term follow-up studies have reported durable functional improvement, including maintained Oswestry Disability Index (ODI) improvement at follow-up exceeding eight years.

Reported complications and radiographic findings associated with Coflex include spinous process fracture, implant loosening, heterotopic ossification, osteolysis, restenosis, and reoperation or conversion to fusion in some patients.

The device received FDA premarket approval in 2012 for one- or two-level lumbar stenosis from L1 to L5 in skeletally mature patients meeting specified clinical criteria.

== Posterior tension-band systems ==
=== LimiFlex ===
The LimiFlex Dynamic Sagittal Tether is a posterior tension-band dynamic stabilization system designed to provide flexion-restricting stabilization following lumbar decompression.

It received U.S. Food and Drug Administration (FDA) premarket approval in February 2026 for use at one level from L3 to L5 in skeletally mature patients following decompression for lumbar degenerative spondylolisthesis (Grade I) with spinal stenosis.

The device is intended to provide dynamic flexion-restricting stabilization after lumbar decompression. According to the FDA Summary of Safety and Effectiveness Data (SSED), LimiFlex increases segmental flexion bending stiffness through dynamic titanium spring couplers attached to woven straps that wrap around adjacent spinous processes through the interspinous ligament.

The FDA-approved indication is limited to patients with Grade I degenerative spondylolisthesis with spinal stenosis and neurogenic claudication or radiculopathic symptoms, including leg pain, muscle weakness and/or sensory abnormality, with or without back pain, who have not responded to at least three months of non-operative treatment.

In the FDA pivotal study, LimiFlex was evaluated in a prospective, multicenter, non-randomized and non-blinded clinical study. The prospective investigational and control arms were concurrently enrolled, and the prospective control population was supplemented with retrospective control subjects. Balance between groups was achieved using propensity-score subclassification.

The FDA SSED reported that the LimiFlex investigational group had a 91.2% Oswestry Disability Index (ODI) responder rate at 24 months, compared with 81.6% in the control group. The same FDA summary reported secondary surgical intervention rates of 7.2% in the LimiFlex group and 10.9% in the control group through the 24-month evaluation period.

Because LimiFlex anchors to the spinous processes, the FDA SSED lists several contraindications related to posterior element anatomy. These include absence or fracture of the spinous processes or posterior elements, deformity that precludes secure fixation, facet joint incompetence, predicted resection of more than 50% of the spinous processes or facet joints during decompression, spondylolysis or isthmic spondylolisthesis at the instrumented level, and an estimated strap attachment distance of less than 30 mm on pre-operative lateral standing radiographs.

The FDA SSED also reported spinous process fractures in the investigational group. The adverse-event summary states that the core laboratory reported 24 spinous process fractures among 140 investigational subjects, corresponding to 17.1% through 24 months. The SSED notes that spinous process fracture was assessed in the investigational group because LimiFlex depends on posterior element fixation, whereas the control fusion group was not assessed for this endpoint in the same manner.

== Pedicle-based dynamic stabilization systems ==
=== Dynesys ===
The Dynesys Dynamic Stabilization System is a pedicle screw–based posterior dynamic stabilization device developed as a nonfusion alternative to lumbar fusion for degenerative spinal disorders. Introduced in the 1990s, Dynesys became one of the most widely studied nonfusion posterior stabilization systems.

The system consists of titanium pedicle screws connected by polyethylene terephthalate (PET) cords and polycarbonate urethane spacers. It was designed to reduce pathological motion while preserving partial segmental mobility and reducing biomechanical stress on adjacent spinal levels.

Early clinical studies reported improvements in pain and disability outcomes, contributing to widespread interest in posterior dynamic stabilization as an alternative to rigid fusion. Biomechanical studies demonstrated reduced segmental motion compared with native anatomy while preserving limited mobility relative to fusion.

As longer-term follow-up became available, the durability and clinical advantages of Dynesys became increasingly debated. Reported concerns included pedicle screw loosening, implant failure, progressive instability, adjacent segment degeneration, reduction of motion over time, and revision surgery. Several systematic reviews and meta-analyses concluded that although Dynesys may preserve limited motion, clear long-term clinical superiority over fusion has not been consistently demonstrated.

Despite mixed long-term results, Dynesys contributed to the evolution of posterior motion-preservation surgery and influenced the development of later stabilization and motion-preserving systems.

=== HPS ===
The HPS (Hybrid Performance System) is a pedicle screw–based dynamic stabilization system designed to limit segmental motion using flexible elements rather than rigid fixation, with the goal of reducing pathological motion while avoiding complete immobilization of the treated segment.

The system consists of pedicle screws connected by flexible components, including spacers and tensioned cords, which are intended to modify load distribution across the motion segment and provide controlled stabilization.

The HPS system is indicated for posterior dynamic stabilization of the lumbar spine (L1–S1) following decompression in patients with degenerative spinal stenosis, including Grade I degenerative spondylolisthesis. The Instructions for Use (IFU) describe its use after "(micro-) surgical decompression." The term "micro-surgical decompression" generally refers to limited or minimally invasive decompression techniques intended to relieve neural compression while preserving as much of the posterior stabilizing structures as possible, in contrast to more extensive decompression procedures that may involve greater resection of stabilizing elements.

Pedicle screw–based dynamic stabilization systems such as HPS reduce pathological motion through flexible constructs rather than restoring normal spinal kinematics. Biomechanical studies of this class of devices have shown that they alter segmental motion patterns and load distribution without fully replicating physiologic motion.

Clinical evidence for HPS is limited compared with other posterior motion preservation systems. Published data consist primarily of small observational or radiological studies, and long-term comparative outcomes remain limited.

As of May 2026, the HPS system does not have U.S. Food and Drug Administration (FDA) premarket approval (PMA) for use as a motion-preserving spinal implant for degenerative spondylolisthesis. Its components may be used as part of posterior spinal fixation constructs under existing regulatory clearances, depending on jurisdiction.

As of 2025, corporate communications have described the HPS system as being available outside of the United States, with distribution focused on international markets.

== Posterior facet and joint replacement systems ==
=== TOPS System ===
The TOPS System (Total Posterior Spine System) is a motion-preserving posterior spinal implant designed to stabilize the lumbar spine following decompression while maintaining controlled motion at the treated segment. The device replaces the function of the posterior stabilizing elements, including the facet joints, after surgical decompression for lumbar spinal stenosis and degenerative spondylolisthesis.

The implant is attached using pedicle screws and is intended to preserve motion in flexion, extension, lateral bending, and axial rotation while limiting abnormal vertebral translation. TOPS was developed as an alternative to lumbar fusion procedures, which eliminate motion at the treated spinal level to restore stability following decompression.

Clinical evaluation of TOPS included a prospective randomized multicenter FDA investigational device exemption (IDE) trial comparing lumbar facet arthroplasty using TOPS with transforaminal lumbar interbody fusion (TLIF) in patients with single-level Grade I degenerative spondylolisthesis and lumbar spinal stenosis. Two-year results published in the Journal of Bone & Joint Surgery reported improvement in patient-reported outcome measures in both groups, with a higher proportion of Oswestry Disability Index (ODI) responders in the TOPS cohort and preservation of motion at the treated level. Three-year results from the same randomized multicenter IDE study reported composite clinical success in 76.0% of patients treated with TOPS and 56.8% of patients treated with fusion. A case series of the second-generation TOPS system reported maintained "close-to-normal" range of motion over longer follow-up, although the study design was observational and did not provide randomized comparative evidence.

A separate prospective cohort study reported sustained clinical improvement, radiological stability, and preservation of motion at the treated level through 11 years following TOPS implantation.

The TOPS System received U.S. Food and Drug Administration premarket approval in 2023 for use in patients aged 35 to 80 years with symptomatic Grade I degenerative spondylolisthesis and moderate to severe lumbar spinal stenosis at a single level from L3 to L5 following decompression.

=== MOTUS ===
The MOTUS Total Joint Replacement System is a posterior lumbar total joint replacement system designed to reconstruct the entire motion segment, including both intervertebral disc and facet joint function, following decompression.

MOTUS has been evaluated in a prospective, multicenter investigational device exemption (IDE) clinical trial conducted at 20 sites in the United States. The study compared 152 patients treated with lumbar total joint replacement to 142 propensity-score-weighted control patients treated with transforaminal or posterior lumbar interbody fusion (TLIF/PLIF).

At 12 months, both groups demonstrated substantial improvements in disability. Mean Oswestry Disability Index (ODI) decreased by 45 points (71%) in the total joint replacement group and 37 points (59%) in the fusion group, with an adjusted between-group difference of 8.1 points favoring total joint replacement (p = 0.005).

The study employed a propensity-score weighted design rather than randomization, and longer-term outcomes are being collected as part of the ongoing clinical investigation.

As of May 2026, the MOTUS system remains investigational in the United States.

== Clinical evidence ==
The level of evidence differs substantially among devices. Coflex and TOPS have randomized controlled trial evidence comparing motion-preserving treatment with fusion in selected lumbar degenerative conditions. In particular, TOPS has been evaluated in a prospective randomized multicenter trial with direct comparison to fusion.

LimiFlex has FDA clinical trial evidence and regulatory approval based on a non-randomized, propensity-score adjusted study. DIAM and HPS are supported mainly by smaller, heterogeneous, or less consistent studies, including observational and radiological series.

MOTUS has investigational clinical evidence from a prospective multicenter IDE study with comparative analysis against fusion controls; however, longer-term outcomes and randomized comparative data remain limited.

== Indications and patient selection ==
Posterior motion preservation devices are generally considered for selected patients with lumbar degenerative disease, especially lumbar spinal stenosis with or without low-grade degenerative spondylolisthesis. Device-specific indications vary by implant and regulatory jurisdiction.

Common considerations include:

- the degree of stenosis;
- presence and severity of spondylolisthesis;
- extent of decompression required;
- facet joint integrity;
- sagittal alignment;
- bone quality;
- instability on flexion-extension radiographs;
- prior surgery at the treated level.

Patients with severe instability, high-grade spondylolisthesis, significant deformity, infection, tumor, or severe osteoporosis may not be candidates for motion-preserving posterior implants, depending on the device.

== Limitations and controversies ==
Posterior motion preservation systems have historically faced challenges related to long-term implant durability, including screw loosening, mechanical fatigue, and maintenance of segmental stability under physiological loading conditions. These issues have been reported across different device classes, particularly in systems relying on pedicle screw fixation or posterior element anchoring.

As a result, long-term follow-up is considered important in evaluating the durability and biomechanical performance of newer systems designed to preserve or reconstruct motion. For investigational total joint replacement systems, longer-term clinical and biomechanical data are required to assess implant survivorship, stability, and performance over time.

For posterior tension-band systems that rely on spinous-process fixation, spinous process fracture is a device-specific consideration; in the LimiFlex FDA SSED, spinous process fractures were reported in 17.1% of investigational subjects through 24 months.

== Regulatory status ==
Device	Device class	United States regulatory status	CE mark
Coflex	Interlaminar stabilization	FDA premarket approval, 2012	Yes
TOPS	Posterior facet arthroplasty / posterior motion-preserving stabilization	FDA premarket approval, 2023	Yes
LimiFlex	Posterior dynamic sagittal tether	FDA premarket approval, 2026	Yes
DIAM	Interspinous stabilization	FDA premarket approval, 2025	Yes
HPS	Pedicle-based dynamic stabilization	No FDA approval or study	Yes
MOTUS	Posterior lumbar total joint replacement	FDA Investigational device	No

== See also ==
- Spinal fusion
- Spinal stenosis
- Spondylolisthesis
- Artificial disc replacement
- Oswestry Disability Index
