= TOPS System =

Spinal medical implant

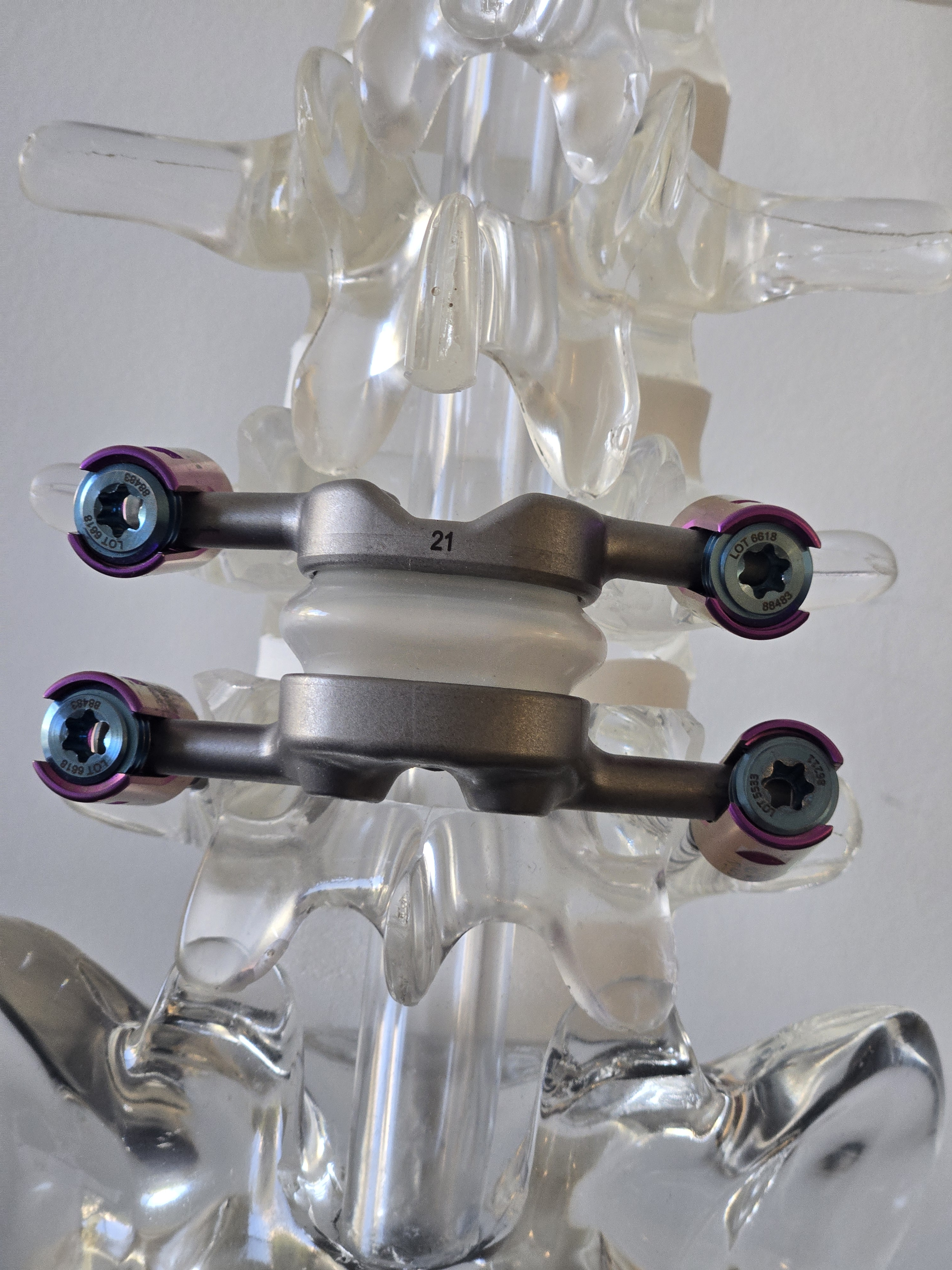
TOPS Implant attached to a spine model

The TOPS System (Total Posterior Spine System) is a spinal implant designed to stabilize the lower spine and maintain range of motion following lumbar decompression surgery for spinal stenosis and related conditions. Unlike spinal fusion, which eliminates motion at the treated level, TOPS aims to preserve mobility while providing stability. The device is manufactured by Premia Spine and has received approval for clinical use in the United States by the Food and Drug Administration (FDA) and in the European Union under the CE (Conformité Européenne) marking.

== Design and mechanism ==
The device consists of two titanium plates connected by a mechanical articulating core. The plates are fixed to the vertebrae using pedicle screws, while the core allows controlled motion in flexion, extension, lateral bending, and axial rotation. This design provides stability against shear forces while permitting physiological movement of the operated segment.

== Surgical procedure ==
TOPS is implanted following a lumbar decompression, in which bone and ligament tissue compressing the spinal nerves are removed. After decompression, the facet joints are excised and replaced with the TOPS implant. The goal is to preserve mobility at the treated level while preventing instability that would otherwise be addressed with spinal fusion.

== Clinical indications ==
TOPS is generally indicated for patients with lumbar spinal stenosis, with or without grade I spondylolisthesis. Higher-grade instability is usually treated with spinal fusion rather than motion-preserving devices.

== Regulatory history ==
The device was evaluated under an investigational device exemption in the United States, where it was compared against transforaminal lumbar interbody fusion. It was later granted FDA Breakthrough Device designation in 2021, followed by full FDA approval in 2023 after demonstrating superiority over fusion in composite clinical success. The TOPS System also holds CE marking, signifying that it meets health, safety, and environmental requirements for sale in the European Economic Area.

== Clinical evidence ==
=== Development and rationale ===
The TOPS System was developed in the early 2000s, with the concept of facet joint replacement introduced by biomedical engineer Uri Arnin. The idea was based on clinical observations that many patients undergoing lumbar spinal fusion have preserved intervertebral discs with degenerative spine pathology affecting the posterior elements of the vertebrae, including spinal stenosis, spondylolisthesis, and facet arthrosis. This led to the development of a motion-preserving alternative to fusion designed to maintain spinal stability following decompression.

The first clinical implantations were performed in 2005, followed by international clinical use and subsequent randomized controlled trials comparing the device with fusion.

=== Randomized clinical trials ===
Randomized controlled trials have compared TOPS to lumbar fusion in patients with lumbar spinal stenosis and grade I degenerative spondylolisthesis. In a large multicenter trial, TOPS demonstrated significantly higher rates of clinical success compared with fusion at two years. Three-year results from the same randomized multicenter investigational device exemption study reported composite clinical success in 76.0% of patients treated with TOPS and 56.8% of patients treated with fusion.

An earlier multicenter analysis of the randomized IDE study reported similar findings, with improved patient-reported outcomes relative to fusion. These improvements included greater reductions in disability as measured by the Oswestry Disability Index (ODI), a standard scale used to assess limitations in daily activities due to back pain. A separate long-term follow-up has shown that TOPS preserves near-normal motion and may reduce the risk of adjacent segment degeneration.

=== Motion preservation and facet arthroplasty ===
Independent reviews place TOPS within a broader group of posterior motion-preserving technologies developed to address the trade-off between decompression, stability, and retained segmental motion. Unlike lumbar disc replacement, which principally addresses disc pathology, facet arthroplasty is intended to restore stability after decompression in patients whose disease involves the posterior spinal elements, including the facet joints. Reviews identify preservation of motion and the potential to reduce adjacent-segment disease as key proposed advantages, while emphasizing the importance of patient selection and the need for continued long-term data on implant durability, revision, and adjacent-segment outcomes.

== Health economics ==
Economic analyses suggest that TOPS may be cost-effective compared with fusion. These findings are based on improvements in quality of life, faster recovery, and reduced need for reoperation over time.

== Limitations and safety ==
Clinical trials comparing lumbar facet arthroplasty with the TOPS system to lumbar fusion have reported overall complication and reoperation rates that are broadly similar between procedures.

Reported adverse events include infection, dural tear, pedicle screw loosening or implant-related complications, and the need for revision surgery.

In randomized studies with two-year follow-up, symptomatic adjacent segment degeneration has been reported more frequently after fusion than after facet arthroplasty.

Appropriate patient selection remains important, as the device is not indicated for individuals with high-grade spondylolisthesis, severe osteoporosis, or significant spinal deformity.

== See also ==
- Artificial disc replacement
- Posterior motion preservation device
