= Zigler =

Zigler is a Germanic surname. Notable people with the surname include:

- Edward Zigler (1930–2019), American psychologist
- Jack Zigler (born 1952), American surgeon
- Sieglinda Zigler (1919–1986), Brazilian swimmer
- Vivi Zigler, American television executive
