= Instrumented posterior lumbar interbody fusion =

Spinal Fusion Surgery

- Specialty: Orthopaedic spine surgeon

Instrumented posterior lumbar interbody fusion (iPLIF) is a common spinal fusion surgical technique for addressing low back pain resulting from degenerative lumbar spine disorders. It involves fusion of two or more levels utilizing screws, rods, and an interbody graft. It has a theoretical advantage over instrumented posterolateral fusion (iPLF) in that it provides better support for the vertebra along with several potential neurological benefits, but as of 2011 evidence demonstrating actual improved clinical outcomes was lacking.
