= Interbody fusion cage =

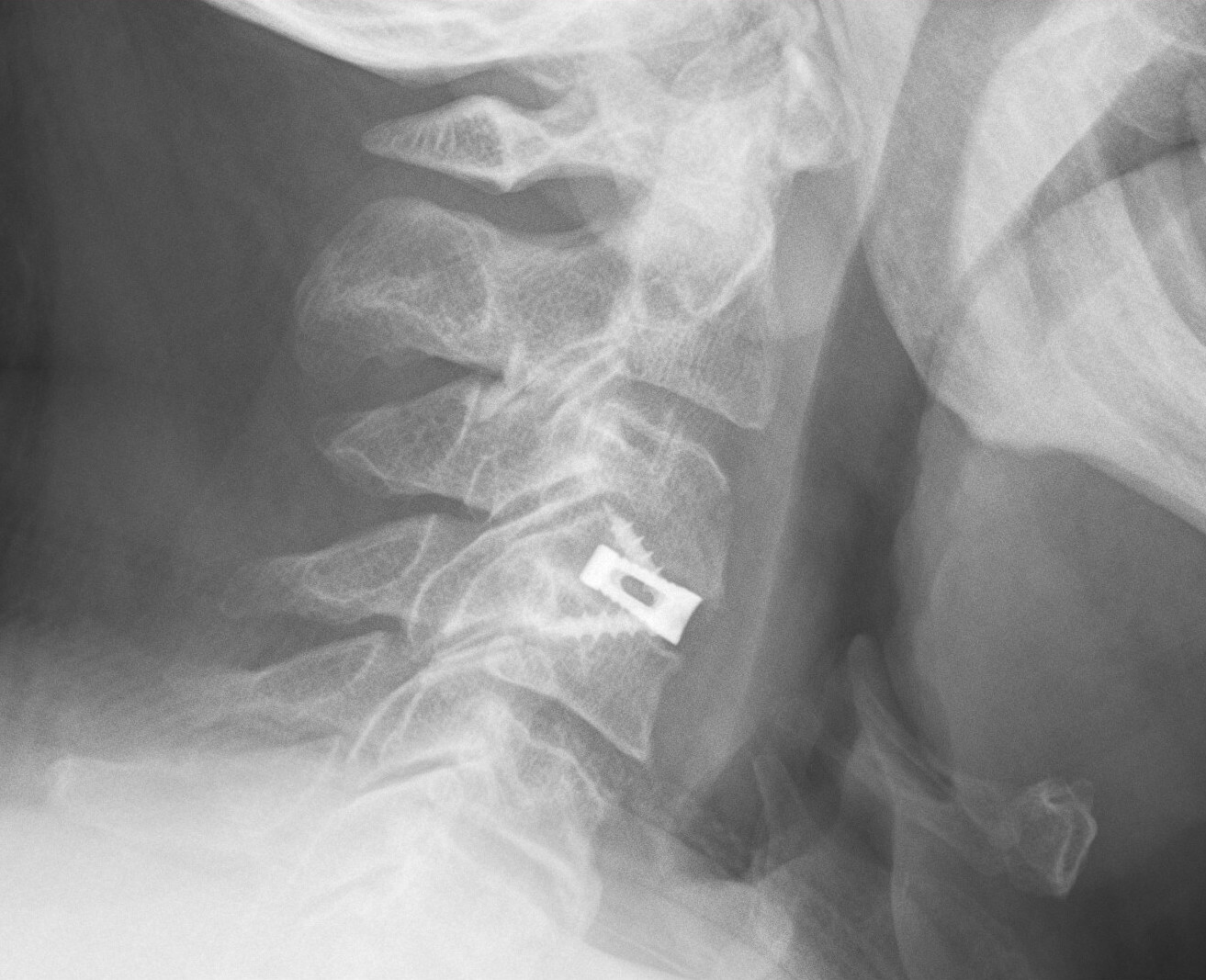
X-ray of interbody fusion cage in cervical vertebrae, Juliet system.

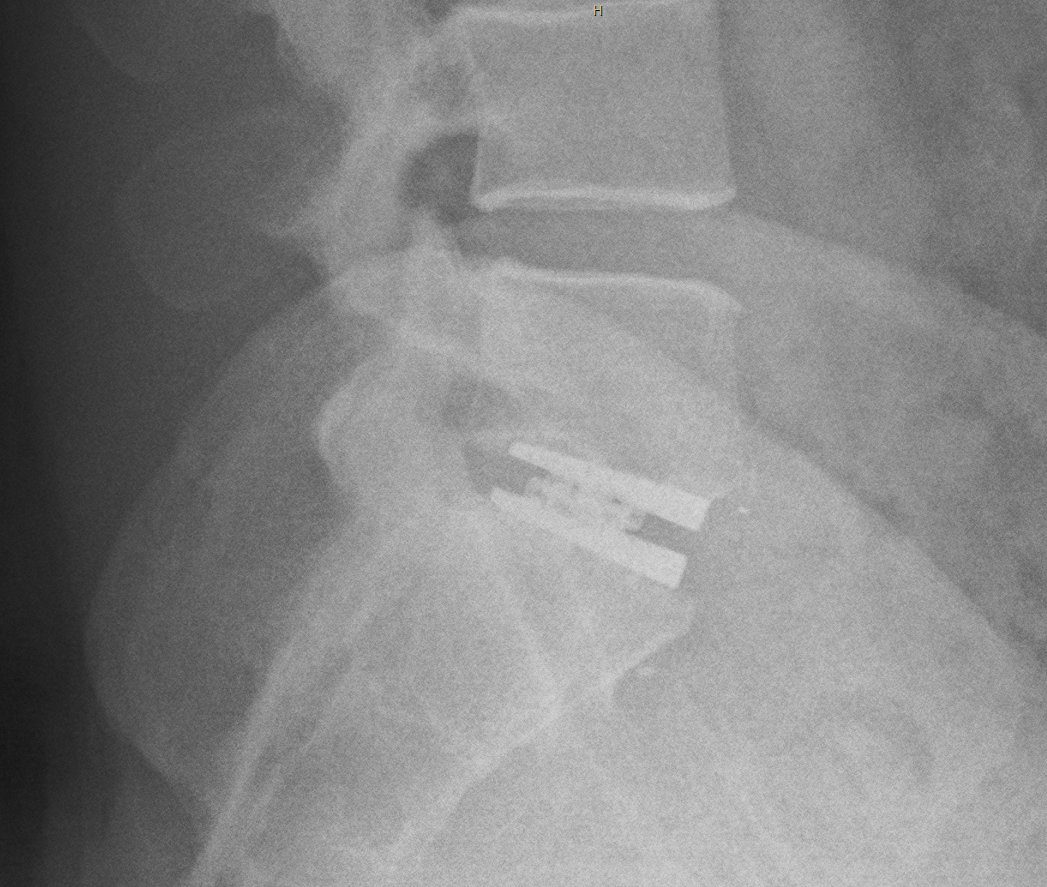
X-ray of interbody fusion cage in L5S1 vertebrae.

An interbody fusion cage (colloquially known as a "spine cage") is a prosthesis used in spinal fusion procedures to maintain foraminal height and decompression. They are cylindrical or square-shaped devices, and usually threaded. There are several varieties: the Harms cage, Ray cage, Pyramesh cage, InterFix cage, and lordotic LT cage, all of which are made from titanium; the Brantigan cage, made from carbon fibre; and the Cortical Bone Dowel, which is cut from allograft femur. The cages can be packed with autologous bone material in order to promote arthrodesis. Such implants are inserted when the space between the spinal discs is distracted, such that the implant, when threaded, is compressed like a screw. Unthreaded implants, such as the Harms and Pyramesh cages have teeth along both surfaces that bite into the end plates.

Technology: expansion vs. static devices Expandable implant devices are at the forefront of technology in this field, with cages that expand in place for optimal end-plate-to-endplate fit and correction of lordosis. There are several technologies for cage expansion; FLXfit by Expanding Orthopedics offers a unique and patented 3D articulation and lordotic expansion, Staxx by Spinewave stacks plates as risers, Varilift by Wenzel - uses a screw device for enlargement and AccuLIF by CoAlign, which has a unique locking hydraulic solution for precise expansion. FlareHawk by Integrity Implants uses stent-like technology, expanding in width, height, and lordosis.

Once placed, the cages resist flexion and extension of the spine, and axial forces across the ventral and middle columns.
