= Physiotherapy (journal) =

- Discipline: Physiotherapy
- Language: English
- Edited by: Michele Harms

Publication details
- History: 1915-present
- Publisher: Elsevier on behalf of the Chartered Society of Physiotherapy (United Kingdom)
- Frequency: Quarterly
- Impact factor: 3.010 (2017)

Standard abbreviations
- ISO 4: Physiotherapy

Indexing
- CODEN: PHSIAO
- ISSN: 0031-9406 (print); 1873-1465 (web)
- OCLC no.: 606003759

Links
- Journal homepage; Online access; Online archive

Physiotherapy is a quarterly peer-reviewed medical journal. It was established in 1915 and is published by Elsevier on behalf of the Chartered Society of Physiotherapy.
