= Jack Zigler =

American orthopedic surgeon

Jack Elliot Zigler (born May 27, 1952 in Brooklyn, New York) is a Board Certified orthopedic surgeon specializing in spine surgery at the Texas Back Institute in Plano, Texas. He is best known for being the first surgeon to perform a ProDisc artificial disc replacement surgery in the United States, on October 3, 2001.

== Organizations ==
Since joining the Texas Back Institute in 1996, Zigler has been an international guest lecturer on topics in spinal reconstruction, as well as a Principal Investigator for the ProDisc artificial disc replacement system's U.S. Food and Drug Administration (FDA) clinical studies. He is a former Clinical Associate Professor of Orthopaedic Surgery at University of Texas Southwestern Medical Center in Dallas, Texas. He served as President of the American Spinal Injury Association from 2003 to 2005.

== Role as ProDisc Principal Investigator ==
Zigler's role as Principal Investigator for the ProDisc, Synthes Spine's artificial disc replacement system, was to monitor all the clinical ProDisc cases done at the Texas Back Institute, and also to serve as a resource to Synthes on questions about cases done at all of the 19 other investigative sites.

On August 14, 2006, the ProDisc-L ("lumbar") Total Disc Replacement was approved by the FDA for use as a treatment for functionally disabling pain from lumbar degenerative disc disease ("DDD"). It was the second device to be approved by the FDA for such a purpose.

As a condition of approval, Synthes Spine is required to conduct a five-year study assessing the long-term safety and effectiveness of the disc. The study will include the 286 patients who participated in the pre-approval clinical trials. The company is also required to complete an annual analysis and report any major adverse events (such as implant breakage, subsidence or expulsion from the disc space). These conditions are similar to those imposed on the Charite artificial disc. Zigler is himself responsible for publication of the national data now that the ProDisc-L has been FDA-approved.

More recently, questions about ethics of surgeon investigators in the Pro Disc study have been raised, specifically in a New York Times article about conflicts of interest related to his Zigler's financial ties, in which it is reported that he invested $25,000 in the company.

Since the time of these articles, there has been no substantiation to support the New York Times' allegations, and a follow-up FDA audit of Zigler's ProDisc site prompted by these allegations turned up no evidence of any wrongdoing.

== In the media ==
Zigler has appeared as a guest expert on Orange County News network in Orange County, California, as well as Good Morning Texas, a morning show produced by the ABC affiliate WFAA-TV in Dallas, Texas. He has been consulted numerous times regarding the spinal injuries of such high-profile celebrities as Christopher Reeve and Jason Priestley.

- Quoted in USA Today article when actor Jason Priestley received injuries in a race-car accident
- Quoted in Cnn.com article on actor Christopher Reeve's spinal cord injury
- Quoted in Orthopedic Tech Review's Industry News section about Christopher Reeve's condition
- Recognized in the Miami Project to Cure Paralysis' newsletter, delivering an honor as ASIA President to a fellow scientist, Damien Pearse, PhD
- Quoted on Raleigh-Durham ABC affiliate's website discussing nonfusion surgical devices

== Publications ==
Zigler is a contributing editor to Spine Trauma and Spinal Arthroplasty, authoritative medical textbooks. He has authored over 45 articles and chapters in internationally-read peer-reviewed medical journals and books.

== Books ==
"Spine Trauma" (1998) and "Spinal Arthroplasty" (2005).
