= Spinal fusion =

Immobilization or ankylosis of two or more vertebrae by fusion of the vertebral bodies

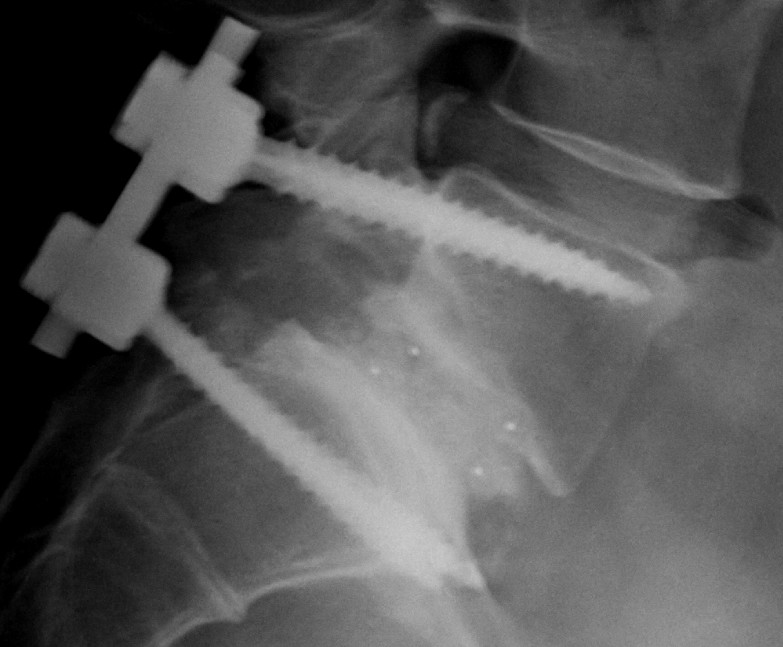
- Fusion of L5 and S1
- Other names: Spondylosyndesis
- Specialty: Orthopedics, neurology
- ICD-10-PCS: M43.2
- ICD-9-CM: 81.0
- MeSH: D013123
- MedlinePlus: 002968

Spinal fusion, also called spondylodesis or spondylosyndesis, is a surgery performed by orthopaedic surgeons or neurosurgeons that joins two or more vertebrae. This procedure can be performed at any level in the spine (cervical, thoracic, lumbar, or sacral) and prevents any movement between the fused vertebrae. There are many types of spinal fusion and each technique involves using bone grafting—either from the patient (autograft), donor (allograft), or artificial bone substitutes—to help the bones heal together. Additional hardware (screws, plates, or cages) is often used to hold the bones in place while the graft fuses the two vertebrae together. The placement of hardware can be guided by fluoroscopy, navigation systems, or robotics.

Spinal fusion is most commonly performed to relieve the pain and pressure from mechanical pain of the vertebrae or on the spinal cord that results when a disc (cartilage between two vertebrae) wears out (degenerative disc disease). It is also used as a backup procedure for total disc replacement surgery (intervertebral disc arthroplasty), in case patient anatomy prevents replacement of the disc. Other common pathological conditions that are treated by spinal fusion include spinal stenosis, spondylolisthesis, spondylosis, spinal fractures, scoliosis, and kyphosis.

Like any surgery, complications may include infection, blood loss, and nerve damage. Fusion also changes the normal motion of the spine and results in more stress on the vertebrae above and below the fused segments. As a result, long-term complications include degeneration at these adjacent spine segments.

== Medical uses ==
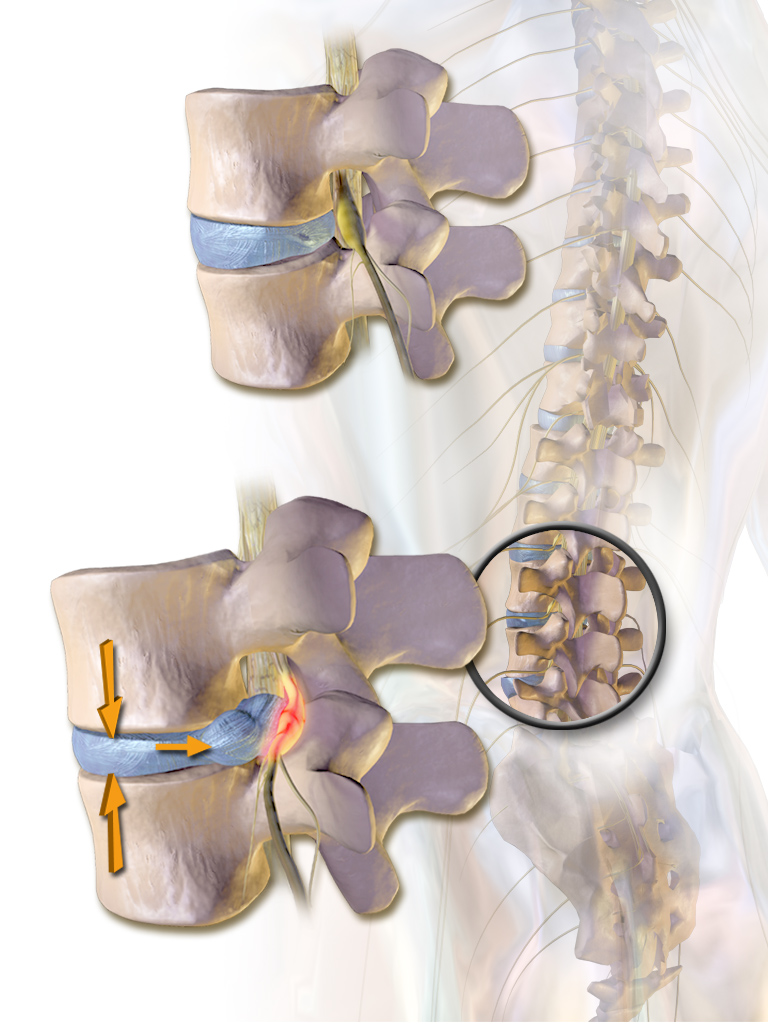
Herniated disc pressing on spinal nerves.

Spinal fusion can be used to treat a variety of conditions affecting any level of the spine—lumbar, cervical and thoracic. In general, spinal fusion is performed to decompress and stabilize the spine. The greatest benefit appears to be in spondylolisthesis, while evidence is weaker for spinal stenosis.

The most common cause of pressure on the spinal cord/nerves is degenerative disc disease. Other common causes include disc herniation, spinal stenosis, trauma, and spinal tumors. Spinal stenosis results from bony growths (osteophytes) or thickened ligaments that cause narrowing of the spinal canal over time. This causes leg pain with increased activity, a condition called neurogenic claudication. Pressure on the nerves as they exit the spinal cord (radiculopathy) causes pain in the area where the nerves originated (leg for lumbar pathology, arm for cervical pathology). In severe cases, this pressure can cause neurologic deficits, like numbness, tingling, bowel/bladder dysfunction, and paralysis.

Lumbar and cervical spinal fusions are more commonly performed than thoracic fusions. Degeneration happens more frequently at these levels due to increased motion and stress. The thoracic spine is more immobile, so most fusions are performed due to trauma or deformities like scoliosis, kyphosis, and lordosis.

Conditions where spinal fusion may be considered include the following:

- Degenerative disc disease
- Spinal disc herniation
- Discogenic pain
- Spinal tumor
- Vertebral fracture
- Scoliosis
- Kyphosis (e. g., Scheuermann's disease)
- Lordosis
- Spondylolisthesis
- Spondylosis
- Posterior rami syndrome
- Other degenerative spinal conditions
- Any condition that causes instability of the spine

== Contraindications ==
Bone morphogenetic protein (rhBMP) should not be routinely used in any type of anterior cervical spine fusion, such as with anterior cervical discectomy and fusion. There are reports of this therapy causing soft tissue swelling, which in turn can cause life-threatening complications due to difficulty swallowing and pressure on the respiratory tract.

== Epidemiology ==
According to a report by the Agency for Healthcare Research and Quality (AHRQ), approximately 488,000 spinal fusions were performed during U.S. hospital stays in 2011 (a rate of 15.7 stays per 10,000 population), which accounted for 3.1% of all operating room procedures. This was a 70 percent growth in procedures from 2001. Lumbar fusions are the most common type of fusion performed ~ 210,000 per year. 24,000 thoracic fusions and 157,000 cervical fusions are performed each year.

A 2008 analysis of spinal fusions in the United States reported the following characteristics:

- Average age for someone undergoing a spinal fusion was 54.2 years – 53.3 years for primary cervical fusions, 42.7 years for primary thoracic fusions, and 56.3 years for primary lumbar fusions
- 45.5% of all spinal fusions were on men
- 83.8% were white, 7.5% black, 5.1% Hispanic, 1.6% Asian or Pacific Islander, 0.4% Native American
- Average length of hospital stay was 3.7 days – 2.7 days for primary cervical fusion, 8.5 days for primary thoracic fusion, and 3.9 days for primary lumbar fusion
- In-hospital mortality was 0.25%

== Effectiveness ==
Although spinal fusion surgery is widely performed, there is limited evidence for its effectiveness for several common medical conditions. For example, in a randomized controlled trial of Swedish adults with spinal stenosis, after 2 and 5 years, there were no significant clinical benefits of lumbar fusion in combination with decompression surgery in comparison to decompression surgery alone. The study enrolled 247 patients from 2006 to 2012 and further found increased medical costs for those who received fusion surgery as a result of increased surgery time, hospital stay duration, and cost of the implant. A 2026 systematic review found that patients with low-grade degenerative spondylolisthesis and spinal stenosis generally experienced similar improvements in pain and physical functioning whether they underwent decompression surgery alone or decompression combined with spinal fusion.

=== Motion-preserving alternatives ===
Motion-preserving approaches aim to maintain segmental mobility while relieving symptoms, in contrast to the rigid stabilization provided by fusion. Two such alternatives include:

- Artificial disc replacement (ADR) – Involves implanting a prosthetic disc at the affected level, preserving motion and potentially reducing adjacent segment degeneration. ADR is a recognized alternative to fusion in selected patients.
- Facet arthroplasty (e.g., the TOPS System) – A posterior-based implant designed to preserve five degrees of freedom—flexion-extension, lateral bending, rotation, and translation—while maintaining spinal stability. In a prospective randomized controlled trial published in the Journal of Bone and Joint Surgery, patients with grade I degenerative spondylolisthesis and lumbar stenosis treated with the TOPS System demonstrated higher rates of clinical success, improved functional outcomes, and motion preservation compared with transforaminal lumbar interbody fusion (TLIF).

== Technique ==
There are many types of spinal fusion techniques. Each technique varies depending on the level of the spine and the location of the compressed spinal cord/nerves. After the spine is decompressed, bone graft or artificial bone substitute is packed between the vertebrae to help them heal together. In general, fusions are done either on the anterior (stomach), posterior (back), or both sides of the spine. Today, most fusions are supplemented with hardware (screws, plates, rods) because they have been shown to have higher union rates than non-instrumented fusions. Posterior lumbar spinal fixation using the conventional pedicle screw trajectory is the most common technique used in lumbar spine fusion. However, the stability of pedicle screws can be compromised in individuals with reduced bone density, which may lead to implant failure and pseudoarthrosis. The cortical bone trajectory (CBT) screw technique has been introduced as an alternative to the traditional pedicle screw trajectory for posterior spinal fixation. CBT screws are smaller and inserted along a caudo-cranial, mediolateral pathway. By engaging the denser cortical bone, CBT screws provide greater anchorage and may be more suitable for patients with osteoporosis. Minimally invasive techniques are also becoming more popular. These techniques use advanced image guidance systems to insert rods/screws into the spine through smaller incisions, allowing for less muscle damage, blood loss, infections, pain, and length of stay in the hospital. The following list gives examples of common types of fusion techniques performed at each level of the spine:

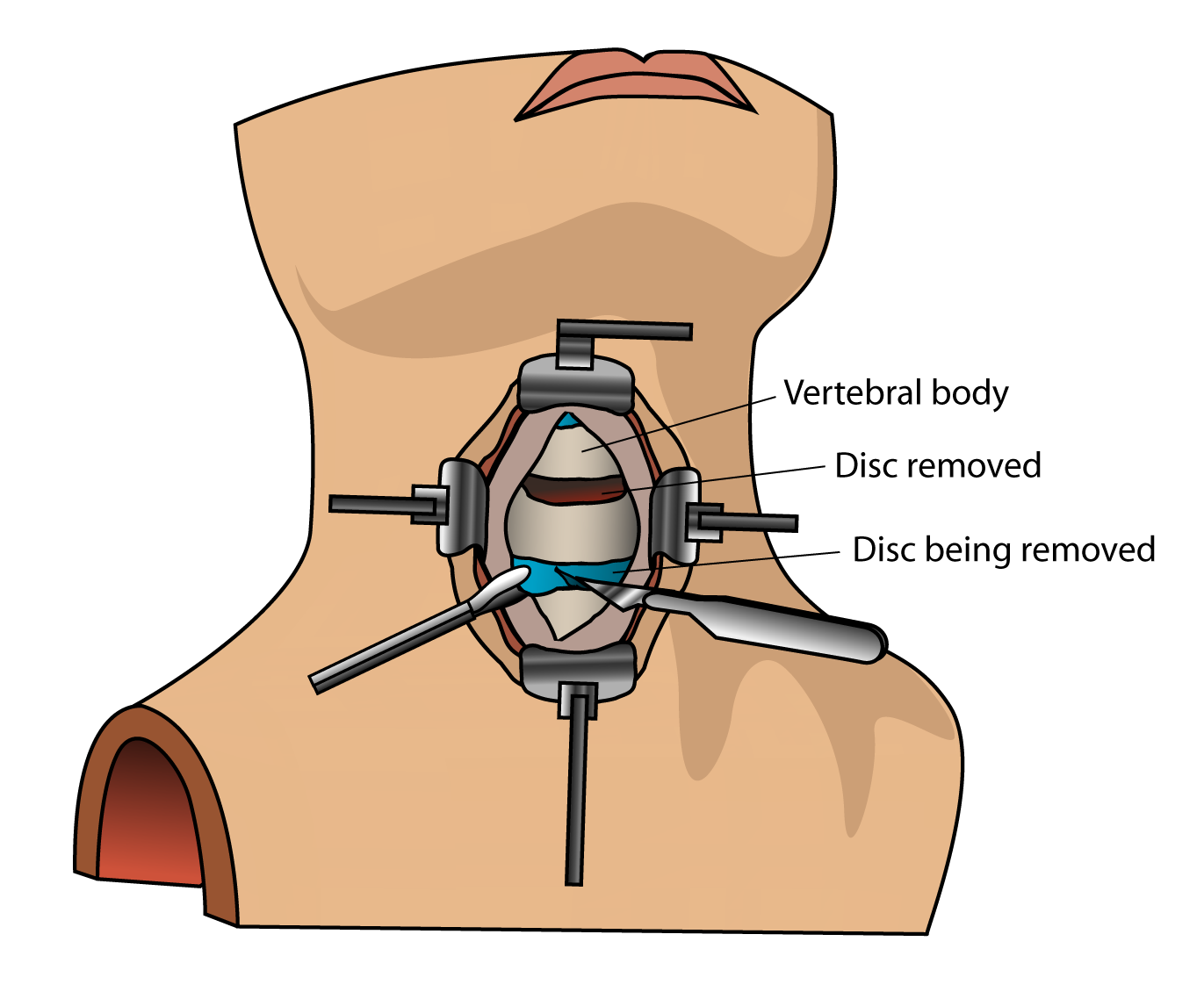
Anterior approach to cervical spine.

=== Cervical spine ===
- Anterior cervical discectomy and fusion (ACDF)
- Anterior cervical corpectomy and fusion
- Posterior cervical decompression and fusion

=== Thoracic spine ===
- Anterior decompression and fusion
- Posterior instrumentation and fusion – many different types of hardware can be used to help fuse the thoracic spine including sublaminar wiring, pedicle and transverse process hooks, pedicle screw-rod systems, vertebral body plate systems.

=== Lumbar spine ===
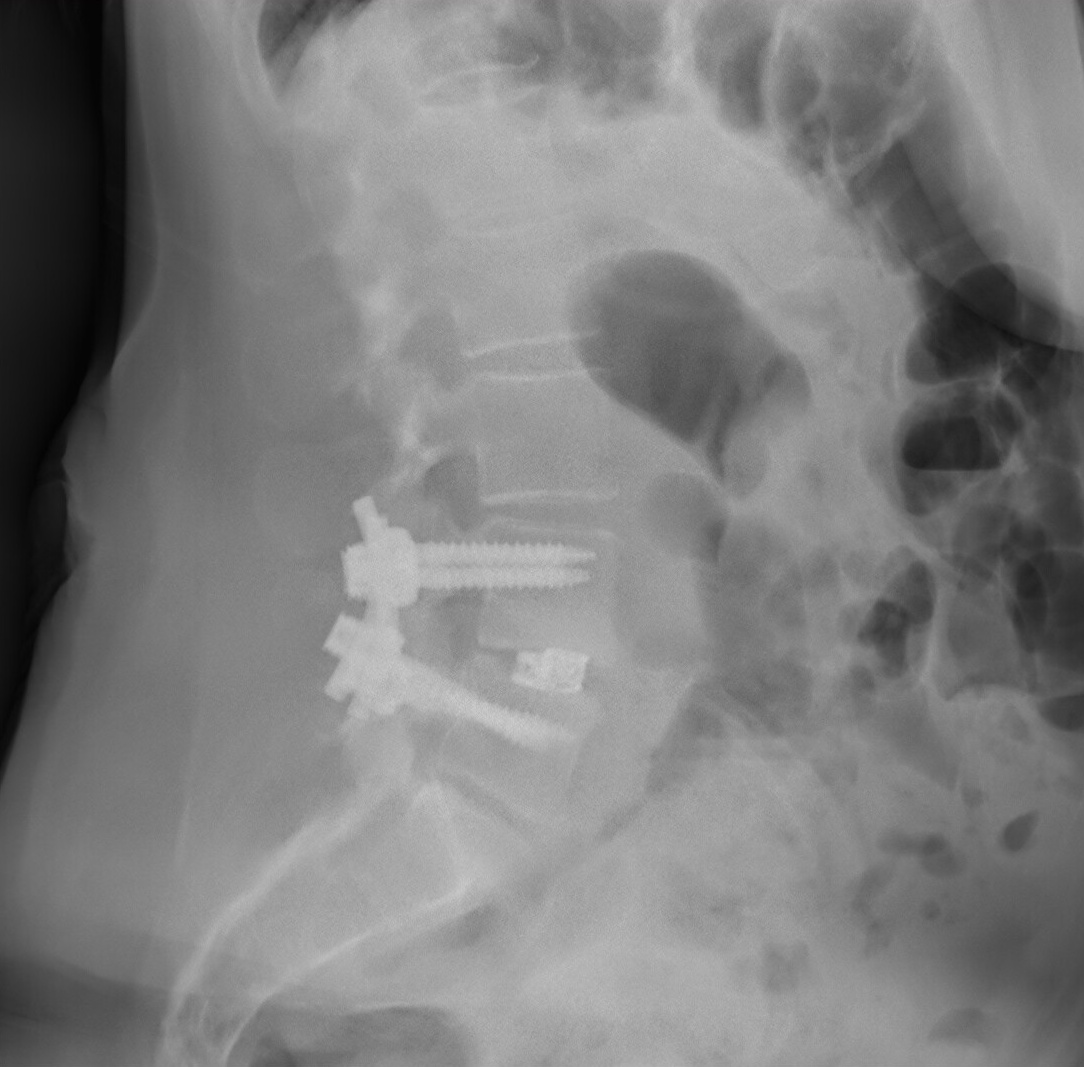
X-ray of Transforaminal Lumbar Interbody Fusion (TLIF)

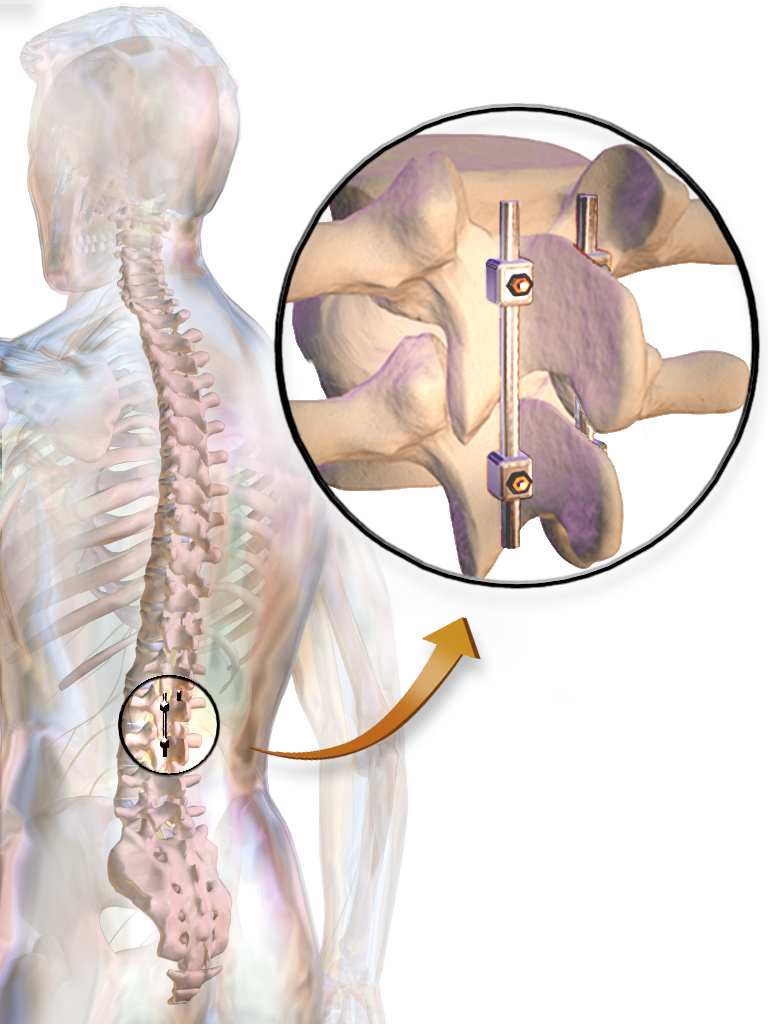
Stabilization rods used after spinal fusion surgery.

- Posterolateral fusion is a bone graft between the transverse processes in the back of the spine. These vertebrae are then fixed in place with screws or wire through the pedicles of each vertebra, attaching to a metal rod on each side of the vertebrae.
- Interbody Fusion is a graft where the entire intervertebral disc between vertebrae is removed and a bone graft is placed in the space between the vertebra. A plastic or titanium device may be placed between the vertebra to maintain spine alignment and disc height. The types of interbody fusion are:
  1. Anterior lumbar interbody fusion (ALIF) – the disc is accessed from an anterior abdominal incision
  2. Posterior lumbar interbody fusion (PLIF) – the disc is accessed from a posterior incision
  3. Transforaminal lumbar interbody fusion (TLIF) – the disc is accessed from a posterior incision on one side of the spine
  4. Transpsoas interbody fusion (DLIF or XLIF) – the disc is accessed from an incision through the psoas muscle on one side of the spine
  5. Oblique lateral lumbar interbody fusion (OLLIF) – the disc is accessed from an incision through the psoas muscle obliquely
  6. Midline lumbar fusion (MIDLF) is a recent minimally invasive interbody fusion technique in which cortical bone trajectory (CBT) screws are inserted and interbody fusion is performed through a small midline posterior incision.

== Risks ==
Spinal fusion is a high risk surgery and complications can be serious, including death. In general, there is a higher risk of complications in older people with elevated body mass index (BMI), other medical problems, poor nutrition and nerve symptoms (numbness, weakness, bowel/bladder issues) before surgery. Complications also depend on the type/extent of spinal fusion surgery performed. Smokers and people who are Vitamin D deficient are at a higher risk of spinal fusion failure. There are three main time periods where complications typically occur:

=== During surgery ===
- Patient positioning on operating table
- Blood loss
- Damage to nerves and surrounding structures during procedure
- Insertion of spinal hardware
  - Conventional Pedicle screws increased the risk of failure compared to Expandable Pedicle screws
- Harvesting of bone graft (if autograft is used) (instead synthetic bone grafts can be used)
- Patients who used the allograft were at a higher risk of fusion failure.

=== Within a few days ===
- Moderate to severe postoperative pain
- Wound infections - risk factors include old age, obesity, diabetes, smoking, prior surgery
- Deep vein thrombosis (DVT)
- Pulmonary embolism (PE)
- Urinary retention
- Malnutrition
- Neurologic deficit
- Shock, sepsis and cerebrovascular infarction

=== Weeks to years following surgery ===
- Infection – sources of bacterial bioburden that infiltrate the wound site are several, but the latest research highlights repeated reprocessing of implants before surgery and exposure of implants (such as pedicle screws) to bacterial contaminants in the "sterile-field" during surgery as major risk factors.
- Deformity – loss of height, alignment, and failure of fusion
- Pseudarthrosis – nonunion between fused bone segments. Risk factors include tobacco use, nonsteroidal anti-inflammatory drug use, osteoporosis, revision procedures, decreased immune system.
- Adjacent segment disease – a condition where spinal levels next to the fused segments develop progressive degenerative change. It is distinct from adjacent segment degeneration, which refers only to radiographic changes without symptoms. Long-term studies have reported that about 22% of patients require additional surgery for ASD within 10 years of lumbar fusion, with rates rising to 40% after three or more fused levels. Risk is further increased by factors such as older age, female sex, obesity, osteoporosis, sagittal imbalance, and certain genetic predispositions, while younger patients with single-level fusions have lower risk.
- Epidural fibrosis – scarring of the tissue that surrounds the spinal cord
- Arachnoiditis – inflammation of the thin membrane surrounding the spinal cord, usually caused by infection or contrast dye.

== Recovery ==
Recovery following spinal fusion is extremely variable, depending on individual surgeon's preference and the type of procedure performed. The average length of hospital stay for spinal fusions is 3.7 days. Some patients can go home the same day if they undergo a simple cervical spinal fusion at an outpatient surgery center. Minimally invasive surgeries are also significantly reducing the amount of time spent in the hospital. Recovery typically involves both restriction of certain activities and rehabilitation training. Restrictions following surgery largely depend on surgeon preference. A typical timeline for common restrictions after a lumbar fusion surgery are listed below:

- Walking – most people are out of bed and walking the day after surgery
- Sitting – can begin at 1–6 weeks following surgery
- Lifting – it is generally recommended to avoid lifting until 12 weeks
- Driving – usually can begin at 3–6 weeks
- Return to sedentary work – usually between 3–6 weeks
- Return to manual work – between 7–12 weeks

Rehabilitation after spinal fusion is not mandatory. There is some evidence that it improves functional status and low back pain so some surgeons may recommend it.

== Usage ==
According to a report by the Agency for Healthcare Research and Quality (AHRQ), approximately 488,000 spinal fusions were performed during U.S. hospital stays in 2011, a rate of 15.7 stays per 10,000 population, which accounted for 3.1% of all operating room procedures.
