= Oswestry Disability Index =

Questionnaire for rating the severity of back pain

- Purpose: used to qualify low back pain

The Oswestry Disability Index (ODI) is an index derived from the Oswestry Low Back Pain Questionnaire used by clinicians and researchers to quantify disability for low back pain and quality of life.

This validated questionnaire was first published by Jeremy Fairbank et al. in Physiotherapy in 1980. The current version was published in the journal Spine in 2000. Four versions of the ODI are available in English and nine in other languages. Some published versions contain misprints, and many omit the scoring system. It is unclear, however, if these adapted versions of the ODI are as credible as the original ODI developed for English-speaking nations.

The self-completed questionnaire contains ten topics concerning intensity of pain, lifting, ability to care for oneself, ability to walk, ability to sit, sexual function, ability to stand, social life, sleep quality, and ability to travel. Each topic category is followed by 6 statements describing different potential scenarios in the patient's life relating to the topic. The patient then checks the statement which most closely resembles their situation. Each question is scored on a scale of 0–5 with the first statement being zero and indicating the least disability and the last statement is scored 5 indicating most severe disability. The scores for all questions answered are summed, then multiplied by two to obtain the index (range 0 to 100). Zero is equated with no disability and 100 is the maximum disability possible.

== Scoring ==
- 0% –20%: Minimal disability
- 21%–40%: Moderate Disability
- 41%–60%: Severe Disability
- 61%–80%: Crippling back pain
- 81%–100%: These patients are either bed-bound or have an exaggeration of their symptoms.

== Recommendations for the minimal clinically important difference (MCID) ==
Copay calculated the minimal clinically important difference (MCID) to be 12.8. Davidson recommends an MCID of 10.5 or 15.

Fritz calculated a value for the MCID of 6.

Vianin's literature review finds the range of MCIDs proposed is 4 to 10.5.
