= Total disc replacement =

Surgical procedure

- Other names: Artificial disc replacement, intervertebral disc arthroplasty
- ICD-9-CM: 80.5

Total disc replacement (TDR), or artificial disc replacement (ADR), is a type of arthroplasty in which degenerated intervertebral discs in the vertebral column are replaced with artificial disc implants in the lumbar (lower) or cervical (upper) spine. The procedure is used to treat chronic, severe low back pain and cervical pain resulting from degenerative disc disease. Disc replacement is also an alternative intervention for symptomatic disc herniation with associated arm and hand, or leg symptoms (radicular pain).

TDR has been developed as an alternative to spinal fusion, with the goal of pain reduction or elimination, while still allowing motion throughout the spine. Faster recoveries after surgery have also been widely reported by surgeons. Another possible benefit is the prevention of premature breakdown in adjacent levels of the spine, a potential risk in fusion surgeries. Recent studies have shown a strong correlation between providing motion in the spine and avoiding adjacent segment degeneration.

== Regulation ==
=== United States ===
Multiple artificial discs (or disc replacements) have been approved by the FDA for use in the US, although several have been discontinued by their manufacturers. The Charité, a mobile core device for use in the lumbar spine, was approved first, in 2004, but is no longer in use. prodisc, the longest continually used disc replacement device in the US, is a fixed core device manufactured by Centinel Spine and was approved in 2006 for the lumbar spine with a cervical device approved in 2007. The first cervical disc replacement available in the US was the Prestige, manufactured by Medtronic. There have been several Prestige cervical disc replacement designs manufactured by Medtronic, with the current design being the Prestige LP.

FDA approvals for devices are for one- or two-level use and at specific levels in the cervical or lumbar spine. Clinical studies are currently required to obtain FDA approval for disc replacements. These studies are comparative, noting differences between patients receiving a new device versus patients that receive spinal fusion or another previously-approved disc replacement. The below table illustrates currently-approved disc replacement devices, their approval dates, the number of approved levels for each device, and their current usage status.

Approved US disc replacements
Device	Anatomy	# Levels, (indicated levels)	Approval Date	In Current Use?
Charité	Lumbar	1 level only (L4-S1)	10/04	No
prodisc L	Lumbar	1 or 2 level (L3-S1)	8/06	Yes
ActivL	Lumbar	1 level only (L4-S1)	6/15	Yes
Prestige	Cervical	1 level only (C3-C7)	7/07	No
prodisc C	Cervical	1 level only (C3-C7)	12/07	Yes
Bryan	Cervical	1 level only (C3-C7)	5/09	No
Secure-C	Cervical	1 level only (C3-C7)	9/12	Yes
PCM	Cervical	1 level only (C3-C7)	10/12	No
Mobi-C	Cervical	1 or 2 level (C3-C7)	8/13	Yes
Prestige LP	Cervical	1 or 2 level (C3-C7)	7/16	Yes
M6-C	Cervical	1 level only (C3-C7)	2/19	Yes
Simplify	Cervical	1 or 2 level (C3-C7)	4/21	Yes
prodisc C Vivo	Cervical	1 level (C3-C7)	7/22	Yes
prodisc C SK	Cervical	1 level (C3-C7)	7/22	Yes
prodisc C Nova	Cervical	1 level (C3-C7)	7/22	Yes

While these discs have received FDA approval, reimbursement by insurance companies is not always automatic. Effective August 14, 2007, the Centers for Medicare & Medicaid Services (CMS) does not cover, on a national basis, Lumbar Artificial Disc Replacement (LADR) for patients over the age of 60. However, individual entities (Medicare Administrative Contractors, or MACs) regulate the determination of covered use of devices in patients 60 and under, and several approve the use of LADR for these patients.[1] Approval by insurance companies is generally better for cervical disc replacements, with over 90% of the US population covered by a commercial payer that reimburses for cervical disc replacements, and over 85% for lumbar disc replacements.

=== Outside of the United States ===
Many countries have their own individualized approval process for medical devices. In Europe, Regulation (EU) 2017/745 defined the Medical Device Regulation (MDR) used for reviewing, approving, and monitoring the quality of medical devices. There are a large number of total disc replacements available and approved for use in Europe, including all of those available in the US. Some other international regulatory bodies base their approvals upon regulations in third party countries, such as the EU or the US. Nearly all countries have their own approval process. The below table lists cervical disc replacement options available outside of the US.

Approved oUS disc replacements
Device	Manufacturer	Earliest Usage
MOVE-C	NGMedical GmbH	2020
Prestige-ST	Medtronic Inc	2003
prodisc C	Centinel Spine	2002
prodisc C Nova	Centinel Spine	2009
prodisc C Vivo	Centinel Spine	2009
Bryan	Medtronic Inc	2000
Secure-C	Globus Medical Inc	2006
PCM	NuVasive (Medtronic Inc)	2002
Mobi-C	ZimmerBiomet	2004
Prestige-LP	Medtronic Inc	2004
Rotaio	SIGNUS Medizintechnik GmbH	2011
Baguera-C	Spineart Geneva SA	2007
Granvia-C	Medicrea International	2010
Freedom-C	Axiomed Spine Corp	2012
Discover	Centinel Spine	2006
CP ESP	FH Orthopedics	2012
Simplify	Simplify	2015
Discocerv	Alphatec Spine Inc	2006
NuNec	RTI Surgical, Inc	2012
Tri-Lobe	Dymicron	2014
NEOphytos	Artworld Medical	Unknown
Activ-C	Aesculap AG	2007
Rhine	K2M	2016
Cadisc-C	Ranier Technology Ltd	2012
Almas	NovaSpine	2012
D6	TrueMotion Spine Inc	Unknown
ACDG5	MAXXSPINE Ltd	2009

== History ==
The first artificial disc was implanted in 1959, with Swedish surgeon Ulf Fernström publishing a description of his experience implanting a stainless-steel ball bearing into an intervertebral disc space after discectomy in 1966. Fernström balls, used in approximately 250 patients, created segmental hypermobility and demonstrated a marked tendency to settle into the vertebral endplates. Reports suggest that function, while initially good, degenerated over time.

During the 1970s, a new concept was introduced: achieving mobility through articulation between the concave and convex surfaces of a multi-component device. Designs patented at that time combined metal, ceramic, or other types of elastic bearings with components made of silicone composites, rubber, polyurethane, plastics, or fluid-filled membranes. Some designs incorporated balloons, cages, pegs, wire screens, hinged plates, or springs. Springs proved to be particularly impractical because they could not withstand biomechanical fatigue tests of stress and strain.

The first design with wide clinical adoption was the Charité disc replacement, designed by East German scientists: two-time Olympic champion in women's artistic gymnastics and physician Karin Büttner-Janz and Kurt Schellnack, a doctor, engineer, and professor—both of whom were affiliated with the Charité Center for Musculoskeletal Surgery at the Medical University of Berlin[2]. First implanted in 1984, the disc had a biconvex polyethylene nucleus within a radiopaque metal ring that interfaced with two cobalt-chromium-molybdenum alloy endplates, which were coated with calcium phosphate. Approved for use in the United States in 2004, after a 4-year clinical trial, Charité was removed from the market by 2012.

The second disc replacement to achieve wide clinical use was the prodisc total disc replacement; it continues to have worldwide use today. Designed by French orthopedic spine surgeon Thiery Marnay, M.D., in the late 1980s, early implantations of the prodisc device began in 1990, with a 7-11 year follow-up published in 2005. After implementing design changes to the bone-facing endplate, and after a clinical study in the United States, the new design was made available worldwide. In October 2001, as part of the FDA trial, Jack Zigler, M.D., a spine surgeon at Texas Back Institute in Plano, Texas, performed the first prodisc L artificial disc replacement in the United States.

== Research ==
The US FDA requires manufacturers to conduct clinical studies to assess the safety and efficacy of disc replacements before obtaining approval to market the devices in the United States. Other devices can be approved for use with simpler non-clinical reviews. As a result, disc replacements have the highest level of clinical evidence of any spine devices. However, since this research is funded by industry, some controversy over data bias produced by the clinical studies exists [see Controversy].

Level 1 and level 1a studies (the highest quality levels: see Hierarchy of Evidence) have shown safety and efficacy for both lumbar and cervical discs, and have become the de facto standard of care for appropriate patients outside of the United States. All prospective, randomized clinical studies that have been run in the United States have shown lumbar and cervical disc replacements to provide faster recovery, better long-term patient satisfaction, and fewer incidents of adjacent segment degeneration than comparative spinal fusion options.

A few non-industry funded studies also exist. In addition to the previously mentioned 7-11 year followup study on prodisc conducted by Thiery Marnay, M.D., a Norwegian study published in The Spine Journal in 2017 compared total disc replacement and multidisciplinary rehabilitation with an eight-year follow up. The study was randomized, controlled, multi-center and not funded by industry. 77 patients randomized to surgery and 74 patients randomized to rehabilitation responded at eight-year follow-up. The study found a statistically significant benefit in favor of surgery.

== Controversy ==
The AAOS states that disc replacement requires a high level of technical skill for accurate placement and has a significant level of risk if revision surgery is needed.

Members of AAOS and the American Association of Neurological Surgeons joined together as the Association for Ethics in Spine Surgery, formed to raise awareness of the ties between physicians and device manufacturers.

Aetna rescinded its positive coverage for single level lumbar ADR after merger with Coventry in 2013. There is currently (in 2022) a class-action lawsuit against Aetna Life Insurance for denying patients seeking lumbar disc replacement surgery in the United States alleging that patients are being harmed by denials since Aetna has declared them 'experimental or investigational'.

Despite published meta-analyses (the highest-level clinical evidence) that have illustrated that total disc replacement seems to be superior to fusion in most clinical parameters, new studies have identified concerns regarding long-term durability of some of these devices. One such recent study identifies a large "midterm failure rate" related to the M6-C. It recommends that "patients implanted with the M6-C prosthesis should be contacted, informed, and clinically and radiologically assessed". Unfortunately, catastrophic failure of the M6-C prosthesis has also been reported.
