= Spinal stenosis =

Disease of the bony spine that results in narrowing of the spinal canal

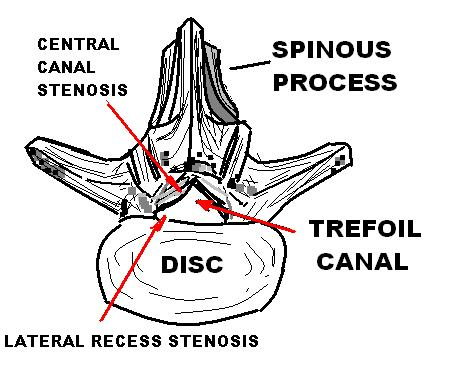
- Spinal stenosis
- Specialty: Orthopedics, neurosurgery
- Symptoms: Pain, numbness, or weakness in the arms or legs
- Complications: Loss of bladder control, loss of bowel control, sexual dysfunction
- Usual onset: Gradual
- Types: Cervical, thoracic, lumbar
- Causes: Osteoarthritis, rheumatoid arthritis, spinal tumors, trauma, Paget's disease of the bone, scoliosis, spondylolisthesis, achondroplasia
- Diagnostic method: Based on symptoms and medical imaging
- Differential diagnosis: Cauda equina syndrome, osteomylitis, peripheral vascular disease, fibromyalgia
- Treatment: Medications, exercises, bracing, surgery.
- Medication: NSAIDs, acetaminophen, steroid injections
- Frequency: Up to 8% of people

Spinal stenosis is an abnormal narrowing of the spinal canal or neural foramen that results in pressure on the spinal cord or nerve roots. Symptoms may include pain, numbness, or weakness in the arms or legs. Symptoms are typically gradual in onset and improve with leaning forward. Severe symptoms may include loss of bladder control, loss of bowel control, or sexual dysfunction.

Causes may include osteoarthritis, rheumatoid arthritis, spinal tumors, trauma, Paget's disease of the bone, scoliosis, spondylolisthesis, and the genetic condition achondroplasia. It can be classified by the part of the spine affected into cervical, thoracic, and lumbar stenosis. Lumbar stenosis is the most common, followed by cervical stenosis. Diagnosis is generally based on symptoms and medical imaging.

Treatment may involve medications, bracing, or surgery. Medications may include NSAIDs, acetaminophen, anticonvulsants (gabapentinoids) or steroid injections. Stretching and strengthening exercises may also be useful. Limiting certain activities may be recommended. Surgery is typically only done if other treatments are not effective, with the usual procedure being a decompressive laminectomy.

Spinal stenosis occurs in as many as 8% of people. It occurs most commonly in people over the age of 50. Males and females are affected equally often. The first modern description of the condition is from 1803 by Antoine Portal, and there is evidence of the condition dating back to Ancient Egypt.

== Types ==
The most common forms are lumbar spinal stenosis, at the level of the lower back, and cervical spinal stenosis, which are at the level of the neck. Thoracic spinal stenosis, at the level of the mid-back, is much less common.

In lumbar stenosis, the spinal nerve roots in the lower back are compressed which can lead to symptoms of sciatica (tingling, weakness, or numbness that radiates from the low back and into the buttocks and legs).

Cervical spinal stenosis can be far more dangerous by compressing the spinal cord. Cervical canal stenosis may lead to myelopathy, a serious condition causing symptoms including major body weakness and paralysis. Such severe spinal stenosis symptoms are virtually absent in lumbar stenosis, however, as the spinal cord terminates at the top end of the adult lumbar spine, with only nerve roots (cauda equina) continuing further down. Cervical spinal stenosis is a condition involving narrowing of the spinal canal at the level of the neck. It is frequently due to chronic degeneration, but may also be congenital or traumatic. Treatment frequently is surgical.

== Signs and symptoms ==
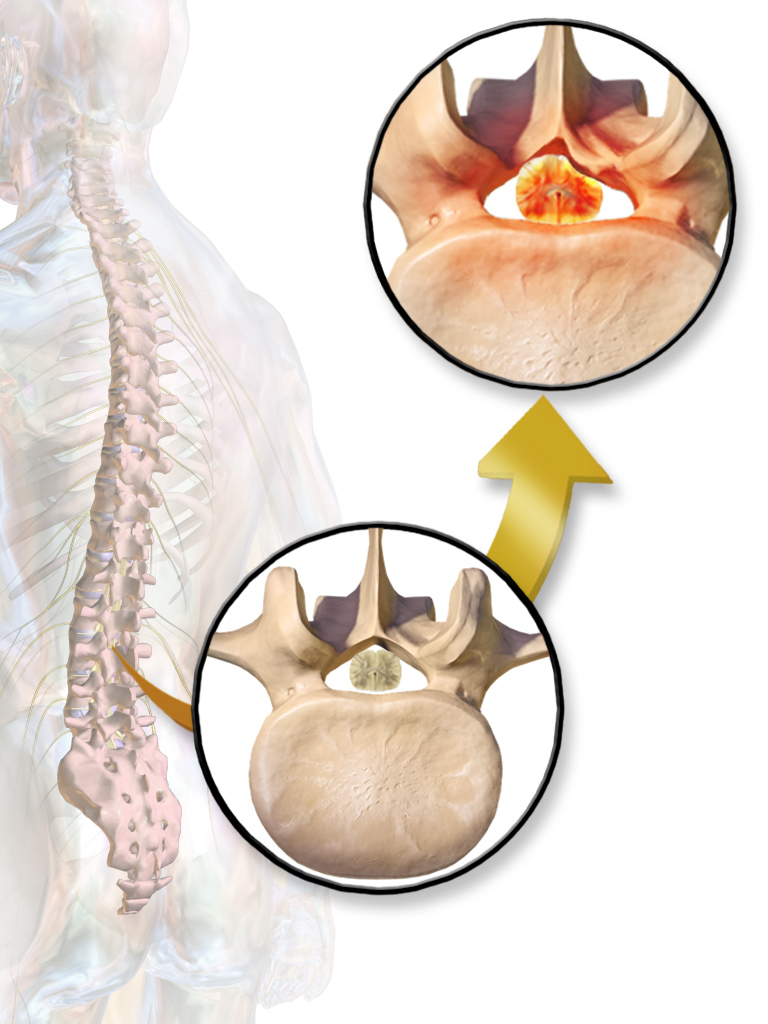
Drawing showing spinal stenosis with spinal cord compression

=== Common ===
- Standing discomfort (94%)
- Discomfort/pain, in shoulder, arm, and hand (78%)
- Bilateral symptoms (68%)
- Numbness at or below the level of involvement (63%)
- Weakness at or below the level of involvement (43%)
- Pain or weakness in buttock / thigh only (8%)
- Pain or weakness below the knee (3%)

=== Neurological disorders ===
- Cervical (spondylotic) myelopathy, a syndrome caused by compression of the cervical spinal cord which is associated with "numb and clumsy hands", imbalance, loss of bladder and bowel control, and weakness that can progress to paralysis.
- Pinched nerve, causing numbness.
- Intermittent neurogenic claudication characterized by lower limb numbness, weakness, diffuse or radicular leg pain associated with paresthesia (bilaterally), weakness and/or heaviness in buttocks radiating into lower extremities with walking or prolonged standing. Symptoms occur with extension of spine and are relieved with spine flexion. Minimal to zero symptoms when seated or supine.

A human vertebral column

- Radiculopathy (with or without radicular pain), a neurologic condition in which nerve root dysfunction causes objective signs such as weakness, loss of sensation, and loss of reflex.
- Cauda equina syndrome: lower extremity pain, weakness, numbness that may involve perineum and buttocks, associated with bladder and bowel dysfunction.
- Lower back pain due to degenerative disc or joint changes.

== Causes ==
=== Congenital ===
- Spinal canal is too small at birth
- Structural deformities of the vertebrae may cause narrowing of the spinal canal.

=== Aging ===
Any of the factors below may cause the spaces in the spine to narrow.

- Spinal ligaments can thicken (ligamenta flava)
- Bone spurs develop on the bone and into the spinal canal or foraminal openings
- Intervertebral discs may bulge or herniate into the canal or foraminal openings
- Degenerative disc disease causes narrowing of the spaces.
- Facet joints break down
- Facet joints may hypertrophy
- Compression fractures of the spine, which are common in osteoporosis
- Synovial cysts form on the facet joints causing compression of the spinal sac of nerves (thecal sac)

=== Arthritis ===
- Osteoarthritis
- Rheumatoid arthritis—much less common cause of spinal problems

=== Instability of the spine ===
- A vertebra slips forward on another (spondylolisthesis)

=== Trauma ===
- Accidents and injuries may dislocate the spine and the spinal canal or cause burst fractures that yield fragments of bone that go through the canal.
- Patients with cervical myelopathy caused by narrowing of the spinal canal are at higher risk of acute spinal cord injury if involved in accidents.

=== Tumors ===
- Irregular growths of soft tissue will cause inflammation.
- Growth of tissue into the canal pressing on nerves, the sac of nerves, or the spinal cord.

== Diagnosis ==
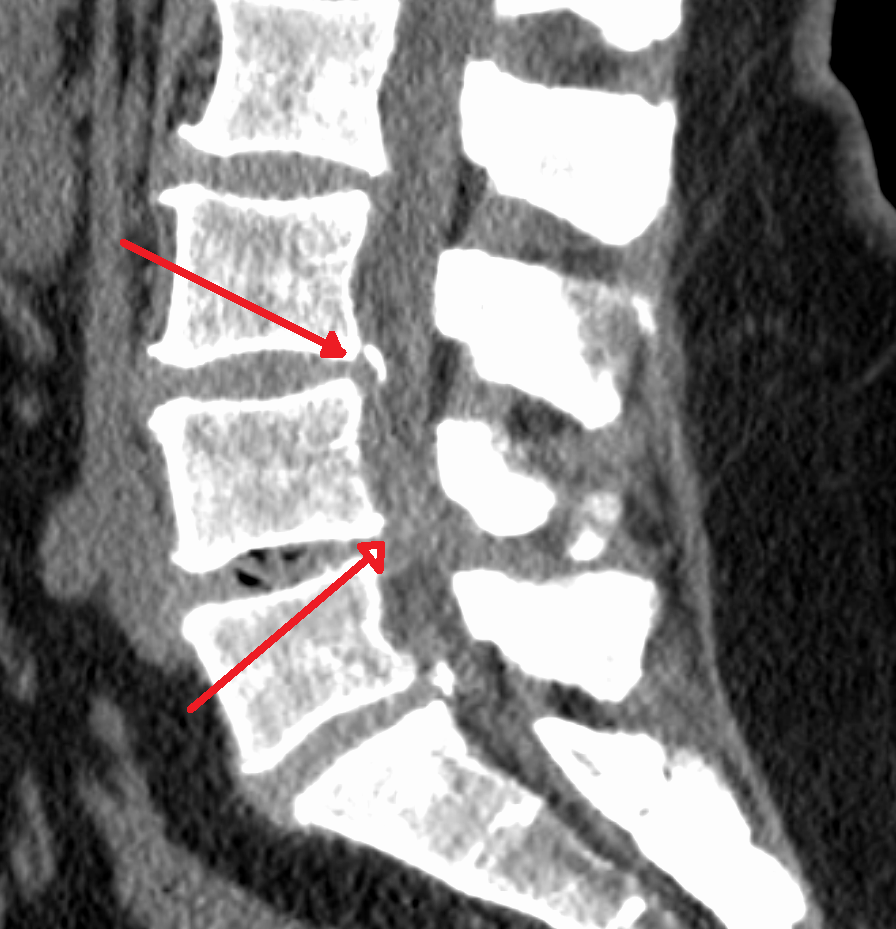
Moderate to severe spinal stenosis at the levels of L3/4 and L4/5

The diagnosis of spinal stenosis involves a complete evaluation of the spine. The process usually begins with a medical history and physical examination. X-ray and MRI scans are typically used to determine the extent and location of the nerve compression.

=== Medical history ===
The medical history is the most important aspect of the examination as it will tell the physician about subjective symptoms, possible causes of spinal stenosis, and other possible causes of back pain.

=== Physical examination ===
The physical examination of a patient with spinal stenosis will give the physician information about exactly where nerve compression is occurring. Some important factors that should be investigated are any areas of sensory abnormalities, numbness, irregular reflexes, and any muscular weakness.

=== MRI ===
MRI has become the most frequently used study to diagnose spinal stenosis. The MRI uses electromagnetic signals to produce images of the spine. MRIs are helpful because they show more structures, including nerves, muscles, and ligaments than seen on X-rays or CT scans. MRIs are helpful in showing exactly what is causing spinal nerve compression.

=== Myelography ===
In CT myelography, spinal tap is performed in the low back with dye injected into the spinal fluid. X-rays are performed followed by a CT scan of the spine to help see narrowing of the spinal canal. This is a very effective study in cases of lateral recess stenosis. It is also necessary for patients in which MRI is contraindicated, such as those with implanted pacemakers.

=== Red flags ===
- Fever
- Nocturnal pain
- Gait disturbance
- Structural deformity
- Unexplained weight loss
- Previous carcinoma
- Severe pain upon lying down
- Recent trauma with suspicious fracture
- Presence of severe or progressive neurologic deficit

== Treatments ==
Treatment options are either surgical or non-surgical. The overall evidence is inconclusive whether non-surgical or surgical treatment is better for lumbar spinal stenosis.

=== Non-surgical treatments ===
The effectiveness of non-surgical treatments is unclear as they have not been well studied.

- Education about the course of the condition and how to relieve symptoms
- Medicines to relieve pain and inflammation, such as acetaminophen, nonsteroidal anti-inflammatory drugs (NSAIDs)
- Exercise, to maintain or achieve overall good health, aerobic exercise, such as riding a stationary bicycle, which allows for a forward lean, walking, or swimming can relieve symptoms
- Weight loss, to relieve symptoms and slow the progression of the stenosis
- Physical therapy to support self-care. Also may give instructions on stretching and strength exercises that may lead to a decrease in pain and other symptoms.
- Lumbar epidural steroid or anesthetic injections have low quality evidence to support their use. A 2026 systematic review found that adding a steroid to an epidural injection of numbing medicine did not further improve pain or function, with moderate strength of evidence.

=== Surgery ===
Lumbar decompressive laminectomy: This involves removing the roof of bone overlying the spinal canal and thickened ligaments in order to decompress the nerves and sacs of nerves. 70–90% of people have good results.

- Interlaminar implant: This is a non-fusion U-shaped device that is placed between two bones in the lower back that maintains motion in the spine and keeps the spine stable after a lumbar decompressive surgery. The U-shaped device maintains height between the bones in the spine so nerves can exit freely and extend to lower extremities.
- Surgery for cervical myelopathy is either conducted from the front or from the back, depending on several factors such as where the compression occurs and how the cervical spine is aligned.
  - Anterior cervical discectomy and fusion: A surgical treatment of nerve root or spinal cord compression by decompressing the spinal cord and nerve roots of the cervical spine with a discectomy in order to stabilize the corresponding vertebrae.
  - Posterior approaches seek to generate space around the spinal cord by removing parts of the posterior elements of the spine. Techniques include laminectomy, laminectomy and fusion, and laminoplasty.

Decompression plus fusion appears no better than decompression alone, while spinal spacers appear better than decompression plus fusion but not better than decompression alone. No differences were found in the type of decompression.

== Epidemiology ==
- The NAMCS data shows the incidence in the U.S. population to be 3.9% of 29,964,894 visits for mechanical back problems.
- It occurs more frequently in women.

== Prognosis ==
In a study of 146 patients with lumbar spinal stenosis (mean age, 68 years, 42% women) who did not undergo surgery, followed up for 3 years, the study reported that approximately one-third of participants indicated improvement; approximately 50% reported no change in symptoms; and approximately 10% to 20% of patients condition worsened.

== Research ==
A randomized controlled trial (RCT) is being conducted in Sweden, to compare surgery versus non-surgical treatment for lumbar spinal stenosis.

== See also ==
- Spinal cord compression
