= Neurogenic claudication =

Discomfort in the legs during walking due to nerve impingement

- Other names: Pseudoclaudication
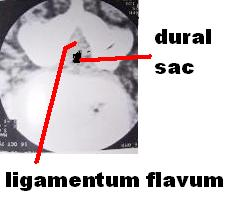
- CT scan of spinal stenosis and thickened ligamentum flavum, causing neurogenic claudication
- Specialty: Orthopedics, neurology, neurosurgery
- Symptoms: Pain, tingling, tiredness, weakness, numbness or heaviness in the legs, hips, glutes and lower back
- Complications: Persistent pain in the lower body, difficulties standing, walking, exercising or performing general tasks, discomfort during sleep, bowel or bladder dysfunction
- Causes: Lumbar spinal stenosis, osteoarthritis, spondylosis, rheumatoid arthritis, Paget's disease, spinal tumor, herniated or ruptured disks, scoliosis, trauma, achondroplasia
- Risk factors: Age, obesity, previous spinal deformities or problems
- Diagnostic method: Physical examination, medical imaging (CT and X-rays)
- Differential diagnosis: Vascular claudication, trochanteric bursitis, piriformis syndrome, muscle pain, vertebral compression fracture, compartment syndrome, peripheral neuropathy, lumbar radicular syndrome (lumbar radiculopathy) and pain in other spinal structures: hip, myofascia, sacroiliac joint
- Treatment: Physical therapy, medications, surgery
- Medication: Non-steroidal anti-inflammatory drugs, prostaglandin-based drugs, gabapentin, methylcobalamin, epidural injections, lidocaine and steroids

Neurogenic claudication (NC), also known as pseudoclaudication, is the most common symptom of lumbar spinal stenosis (LSS) and describes intermittent leg pain from impingement of the nerves emanating from the spinal cord. Neurogenic means that the problem originates within the nervous system. Claudication, from Latin claudicare 'to limp', refers to painful cramping or weakness in the legs. NC should therefore be distinguished from vascular claudication, which stems from a circulatory problem rather than a neural one.

The term neurogenic claudication is sometimes used interchangeably with spinal stenosis. However, the former is a clinical term, while the latter more specifically describes the condition of spinal narrowing. NC is a medical condition most commonly caused by damage and compression to the lower spinal nerve roots. It is a neurological and orthopedic condition that affects the motor nervous system of the body, specifically, the lower back, legs, hips and glutes. NC does not occur by itself, but rather, is associated with other underlying spinal or neurological conditions such as spinal stenosis or abnormalities and degenerative changes in the spine. The International Association for the Study of Pain defines neurogenic claudication as "pain from intermittent compression and/or ischemia of a single or multiple nerve roots within an intervertebral foramen or the central spinal canal". This definition reflects the current hypotheses for the pathophysiology of NC, which is thought to be related to the compression of lumbosacral nerve roots by surrounding structures, such as hypertrophied facet joints or ligamentum flavum, bone spurs, scar tissue, and bulging or herniated discs.

The predominant symptoms of NC involve one or both legs and usually presents as some combination of tingling, cramping discomfort, pain, numbness, or weakness in the lower back, calves, glutes, and thighs and is precipitated by walking and prolonged standing. However, the symptoms vary depending on the severity and cause of the condition. Lighter symptoms include pain or heaviness in the legs, hips, glutes and lower back, post-exercise. Mild to severe symptoms include prolonged constant pain, tiredness and discomfort in the lower half of the body. In severe cases, impaired motor function and ability in the lower body can be observed, and bowel or bladder dysfunction may be present. Classically, the symptoms and pain of NC are relieved by a change in position or flexion of the waist. Therefore, patients with NC have less disability in climbing steps, pushing carts, and cycling.

Treatment options for NC depends on the severity and cause of the condition, and may be nonsurgical or surgical. Nonsurgical interventions include drugs, physical therapy, and spinal injections. Spinal decompression is the main surgical intervention and is the most common back surgery in patients over 65. Other forms of surgical procedures include: laminectomy, microdiscectomy and laminoplasty. Patients with minor symptoms are usually advised to undergo physical therapy, such as stretching and strengthening exercises. In patients with more severe symptoms, medications such as pain relievers and steroids are prescribed in conjunction with physical therapy. Surgical treatments are predominantly used to relieve pressure on the spinal nerve roots and are used when nonsurgical interventions are ineffective or show no effective progress.

Diagnosis of neurogenic claudication is based on typical clinical features, the physical exam, and findings of spinal stenosis on computer tomography (CT) or X-ray imaging. In addition to vascular claudication, diseases affecting the spine and musculoskeletal system should be considered in the differential diagnosis.

== Signs and symptoms ==
Neurogenic claudication commonly describes pain, weakness, fatigue, tingling, heaviness and paresthesias that extend into the lower extremities. These symptoms may involve only one leg, but they usually involve both. Leg pain is usually more significant than back pain in individuals who have both. NC is classically distinguished by symptoms improving or worsening with certain activities and manoeuvres. Pain may occur with walking, standing, and back extension. Sitting and bending or leaning forward tend to provide relief. Patients may also report that pain is worse while walking down stairs and improved while walking up stairs or using a bicycle or shopping cart. A positive "shopping cart sign" refers to the worsening of pain with spinal extension and improvement with spinal flexion.

Whilst these common symptoms are usually present in many patients with NC, rarer and more serious symptoms can occur in severe cases of NC. In extreme cases of NC constant discomfort, pain or numbness is experienced. This results in patients to have decreased mobility and function as excessive or constant movements cause pain. Exercise and prolonged walking often become difficult and are triggers of pain, tiredness, numbness and heaviness in the legs, lower back and hips. Common tasks such as standing upright for an extended duration or picking up heavy objects may become increasingly difficult to perform. In addition, patients with severe NC may experience difficulties sleeping as lying down on their back causes discomfort and pain. In very extreme cases, bowel or bladder dysfunction can occur. However, this is a consequence of the underlying cause of NC rather than the condition itself. As most causes of NC involve increased pressure or damage to the nerves in the lower spine, damage and pressure on the nerves that extend to the bowel or bladder may occur, leading to bowel or bladder dysfunction.

On physical examination, patients with NC have normal peripheral pulses. The neurologic exam, straight leg raise, and femoral nerve stretch are typically normal. Abnormal signs may be revealed if the patient is observed walking until they exhibit NC. For example, a positive "stoop test" is observed if bending forward or stooping while walking relieves symptoms. Occasionally, patients may have other signs such as sensory loss or gait changes.

== Causes ==
Neurogenic claudication is the fundamental clinical feature of LSS, which may be congenital or acquired. As a result of LSS, the spinal canal in the lumbar spine narrows, causing damage and arthritic changes in the spine. These changes, such as bulging disks, thickening of ligaments and overgrowth of bone spurs, lead to pressure and potentially damage to the spinal nerve roots. The compression of the spinal nerve roots that control movements and sensations in the lower body subsequently causes the symptoms of NC. The causes of LSS are most commonly acquired and include degenerative changes such as degenerative disc disease and spinal osteoarthritis. LSS may also be acquired from changes due to spinal surgery such as excess scar tissue or bone formation. Other secondary causes include space-occupying lesions, ankylosing spondylitis, rheumatoid arthritis, and Paget's disease. Less commonly, the cause of spinal stenosis may be present at birth as seen in achondroplasia, spina bifida, and certain mucopolysaccharidoses. In addition to spinal stenosis, other lower back conditions such as spondylosis, tumors, infections and herniated or ruptured discs can cause NC. These conditions contribute to the potential narrowing of the spinal cord, increasing pressure and inducing damage on the spinal nerve roots, thus, causing paing, tingling or weakness in the lower body.

Risk factors for LSS include:

- Age
- Degenerative changes of the spine
- Obesity
- Family history of spinal stenosis
- Tobacco use
- Occupation involving repetitive mechanical stress on the spine
- Past deformities or injuries to the spine

== Diagnosis and evaluation ==
MRI of the lumbar spine showing spinal stenosis

Neurogenic claudication is one subtype of the clinical syndrome of lumbar spinal stenosis (LSS). No gold standard diagnostic criteria currently exist, but evaluation and diagnosis is generally based on the patient history, physical exam, and medical imaging. The accuracy of a diagnosis of NC increases with each additional suggestive clinical finding. Therefore, a combination of signs and symptoms may be more helpful in diagnosing NC than any single feature of the history or physical exam. These signs and symptoms include pain triggered by standing, pain relieved by sitting, symptoms above the knees, and a positive "shopping cart sign".

Specific questions that may aid diagnosis include:

- "Does the patient have leg or buttock pain while walking?"
- "Does the patient flex forward to relieve symptoms?"
- "Does patient feel relief when using a shopping cart or bicycle?"
- "Does the patient have motor or sensory disturbance while walking?"
- "Are the pulses in the foot present and symmetric?"
- "Does the patient have lower extremity weakness?"
- "Does the patient have low back pain?"

The physical exam may include observation, evaluation of pulses in the foot, lumbar spine range of motion, and components of a neurological exam.

Helpful imaging may include x-rays, CT, CT myelogram, and magnetic resonance imaging (MRI), but MRI is preferred. Abnormal MRI findings may be present in two-thirds of asymptomatic individuals, and imaging findings of spinal stenosis do not correlate well with symptom severity. Therefore, imaging findings must be considered in the context of a patient's history and physical exam when seeking a diagnosis. The evidence for using objective imaging findings to define NC has been conflicting.

=== Differential diagnosis ===
Neurogenic claudication must be differentiated from other causes of leg pain, which may be present in a number of conditions involving the spine and musculoskeletal system. The differential diagnosis for NC includes:

- Vascular claudication
- Lumbosacral radicular pain secondary to lumbar disc herniation
- Referred pain from spinal structures, hip or sacroiliac joint, myofascia, or viscera
- Trochanteric bursitis
- Piriformis syndrome
- Muscle pain
- Vertebral compression fracture
- Compartment syndrome
- Peripheral neuropathy

=== Neurogenic vs vascular claudication ===
Neurogenic vs Vascular Claudication
Clinical feature	Neurogenic	Vascular
Pain worse with	Standing, walking	Walking
Pain relieved by	Spinal flexion, sitting	Standing
Timing of relief	Within minutes	Immediately
Location	Above the knees	Below the knees
Radiation of pain	Extends down legs	Extends up legs
Quality of pain	Sharp	Cramping, dull
Back pain	Common	Sometimes
Peripheral pulses	Present	May be absent

Both neurogenic claudication and vascular claudication manifest as leg pain with walking, but several key features help distinguish between these conditions. In contrast to NC, vascular claudication does not vary with changes in posture. Patients with vascular claudication may experience relief with standing, which may provoke symptoms in NC. The walking distance necessary to produce pain in vascular claudication is more consistent than in neurogenic claudication.

== Pathophysiology ==
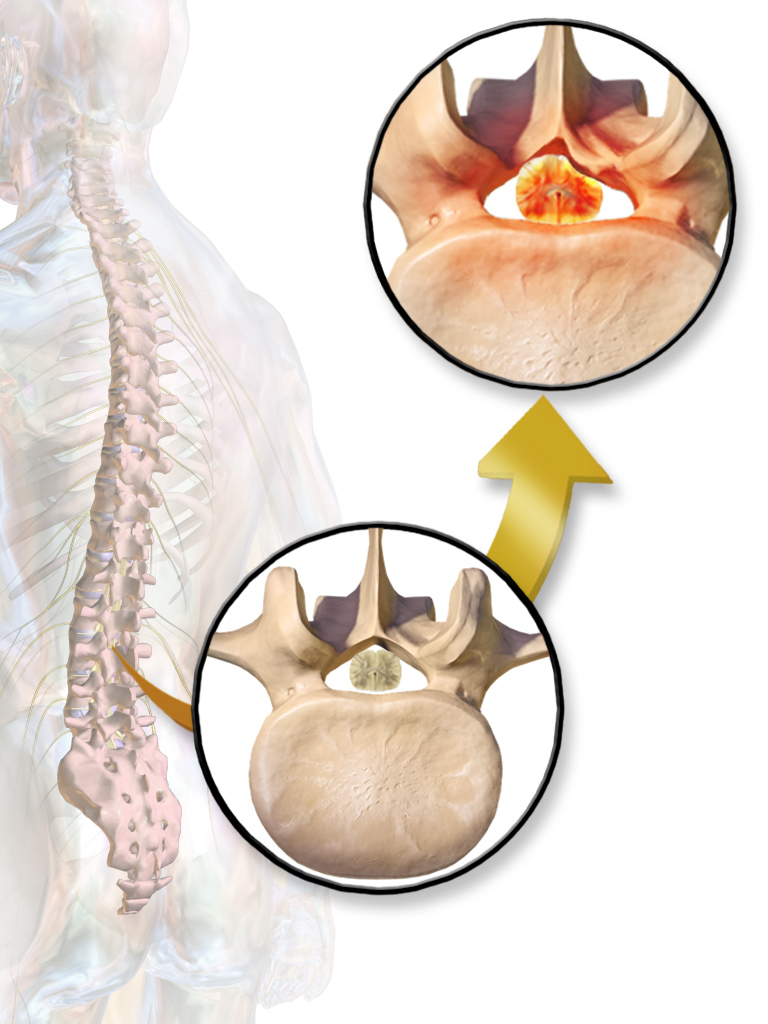
Degenerative changes cause compression of the spinal cord

Degenerative disc disease (DDD) may trigger the pathogenesis of neurogenic claudication. When intervertebral discs degenerate and change shape in DDD, the normal movements of the spine are interrupted. This results in spinal instability and more degenerative changes in spinal structures including facet joints, ligamentum flavum, and intervertebral discs. These pathologic changes result in narrowing of the vertebral canal and neurovascular compression at the lumbosacral nerve roots. The compression of these spinal nerve roots that control sensation and movement in the lower body results in the tingling, pain and weakness NC patients often experience. However, because the severity of symptoms does not correlate well with the degree of stenosis and nerve root compression, a clear understanding of the specific pathogenesis remains challenging.

It is currently unknown which exact cellular mechanisms within the body causes the pain of NC as a response to the compression of spinal nerves. The two main proposed mechanisms agree that neurovascular compression plays a role. The ischemic theory proposes that poor blood supply to the spinal nerve roots results in NC. In contrast, the venous stasis theory proposes that a combination of low oxygen levels and metabolite buildup are responsible due to venous backup at the cauda equina. Pain with walking may be partially explained by the corresponding increase in nerve root oxygen requirements.

These changes in blood flow may occur during back extension when shifts in vertebral structures and ligaments narrow the spinal canal and compress the neurovasculature. Compared to a neutral position, extended spines exhibit 15% less cross-sectional area of the intervertebral foramina, and nerve root compression is present one-third of the time. These dynamic changes in the shape of the spinal canal are more pronounced in individuals with spinal stenosis. The amount of narrowing may be 67% in LSS compared to 9% in healthy spines.

== Treatment ==
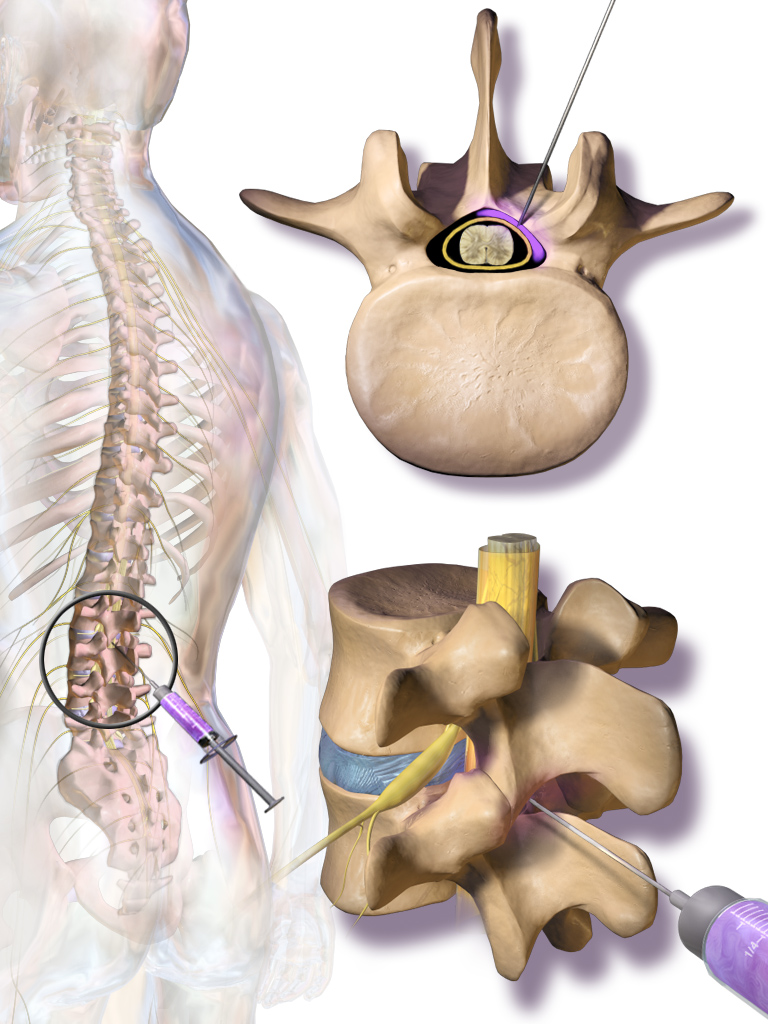
Spinal injection into the epidural space

Treatment options for NC aim to cure the underlying cause of the condition, such as lumbar spinal stenosis (LSS) or other degenerative spinal diseases. Decreased walking and lower body motor ability due to NC is the primary disabling feature of LSS. Constant discomfort and pain in the lower extremities and an inability to sleep and lying down are also disabling features of NC that affect a patient's quality of life. Therefore, the target of most treatments is to solve these complications. Currently, several treatment options are available to patients, and they can be grouped broadly into nonsurgical and surgical options. Nonsurgical treatments include medications, physical therapy, and spinal injections. Medication options for neurogenic claudication have included non-steroidal anti-inflammatory drugs (NSAIDs), prostaglandin-based drugs, gabapentin, and methylcobalamin. However, the quality of evidence supporting their use is not high enough for specific recommendations. Physical therapy is commonly prescribed to patients, but the quality of evidence supporting its use for neurogenic claudication is also low. One quarter of all epidural injections are administered to treat symptoms of LSS. Preparations may contain lidocaine and/or steroids. They may be considered for short-term pain relief or to delay surgery, but their benefit is considered small.

=== Physical Therapy ===
Patients that experience light to mild symptoms are commonly treated through physical therapy, which involves stretching and strengthening the lower back, abdominal (core) and leg muscles. Common stretches used include the knee to chest stretch, posterior pelvic tilt, neural stretching of the legs, hip-flexor stretch and lower trunk rotation. In conjunction with these stretches, various strengthening exercises are often implemented, targeting the core, lower back and hip muscles. Common exercises include bridges, bird to dog, tabletop leg press, clamshell and knees to chest. Depending on the age, mobility and physical health of patients, a combination of easier and more difficult exercises should be prescribed to suit the patient's needs. More difficult exercises may include the incorporation of resistance training (weights), gym equipment and more explosive movements. Other exercises such as cycling (stationary), swimming and water-based activities have also been found to strengthen and improve overall stability and strength in the core, lower back and hips. Ultimately, the aim of physical therapy is to loosen and relax the tight muscles and ligaments that contribute to the symptoms, and to strengthen those muscles to prevent further reocurrences of the condition. However, studies have found conflicting conclusions in regards to the effectiveness of physical therapy as a treatment option for NC patients. Thus, the low quality of evidence supporting its use has prompted further research into physical therapy as a treatment option for NC to be necessary.

==== Stretching exercises ====
Common stretching exercises used to relieve pain and treat NC include:

- Knee to chest stretch - Lying down on the back, bring one leg up and pull it towards the chest and hold for 30–45 seconds.
- Posterior pelvic tilt (bridges) - Lying on the back, bend both legs and place your feet on the floor. Raise stomach from the ground, lifting the back and pelvis, until the back is straight. Hold for 5–10 seconds and relax.
- Neural Stretching of the legs - Lying on the back, bring one leg up with a stretching band until a stretch is felt in the legs. Ensure your legs are straight. Once the stretch is felt, hold for 30–45 seconds and relax.
- Hip-flexor stretch - To stretch the right hip-flexor, bring the left leg forward, and kneel on the right knee. Push the pelvis forward (lean forward), whilst keeping the upper body straight. Hold the position for 30–45 seconds and relax. To stretch the left hip-flexor, bring swap the positions of the legs.
- Lower trunk rotation - Lying down on the back, bring both knees towards your chest whilst keeping the back flat on the floor. Rotate the bent legs from the left to right side and vice versa whilst keeping back flat on the ground.

==== Strengthening exercises ====
Common strengthening exercises used to treat and prevent future reocurrences of NC include:

- Posterior pelvic tilt (bridges) - Lying on the back, bend both legs and place your feet on the floor. Raise stomach from the ground, lifting the back and pelvis, until the back is straight. Hold for 5–10 seconds and relax.
- Quadruped opposite arm/leg (bird to dog) - On all fours (knees on ground and arms against floor supporting upper body) straighten one knee whilst straightening the opposite side arm and hold for 3 seconds and repeat for the other arm/leg pair.
- Tabletop leg press press - Lying on the back, bring both knees towards the chest and then straighten both legs (such that legs are hanging in the air), whilst keeping the back flat on the ground.
- Clamshell - Whilst lying on the side with knees bent inwards, bring the top knee up (whilst keeping leg bent) and hold for 3 seconds. To exercise the opposite leg, lie on the opposite side and repeat.
- Abdominal draw-in (knee to chest) - Lying flat on the back, bend both legs and bring knees towards the chest without lifting the back from the ground and then straighten legs again. For a more difficult version of the exercise, keep one leg bent and feet on the ground and bring the other leg towards the chest.

=== Medications ===
Medications such as NSAIDs, prostaglandin-based drugs, gabapentin, methylcobalamin and epidural steroid injections are often used in conjunction with physical therapy to treat patients with mild or moderate symptoms of NC. The main goal of these medications is to reduce pain and provide temporary relief for NC patients. NSAIDs and prostaglandin-based medications control inflammation at sites of nerve damage or pressure by inhibiting cyclooxygenase activity, and reducing the production of prostaglandins, a key contributor of inflammation. By reducing inflammation, less pressure is put on the nerve roots, decreasing pain, and providing relief for NC patients. Gabapentin aims to reduce pain and provide relief by altering the normal functioning of neurotransmitters that induce a sensation of pain and discomfort. However, the exact mechanism of Gabapentin's functioning in the body is not completely understood and current knowledge is based on experimental studies that target the nervous system. Methylcobalamin is another medication that targets the nervous system to reduce pain and provide NC patients with temporary pain-relief. The drug produces myelin to cover and protect nerves from damage, preventing pain induced from damaged nerve roots, as described in some cases of NC. Epidural steroid injections are the main epidural injections prescribed to treat NC. They inhibit the inflammatory cascade signalling to reduce inflammation at sites of spinal nerve damage or pressure. Consequently, they reduce pain and provide relief to individuals with NC. Whilst the use of medications is common among NC patients that experience frequent or constant pain, their effectiveness has yielded mixed results in studies. Further research into their viability as a medication for NC is necessary to allow doctors to provide better care and treatment options for NC patients.

=== Surgical interventions ===
Depending on the cause and severity of the condition, surgical options for NC vary. Symptoms of LSS, including NC, are the most common reason patients 65 and older undergo spinal surgery. Surgery is generally reserved for patients whose symptoms do not improve with nonsurgical treatments, and the main objective of surgery is to relieve pressure on the spinal nerve roots and recover normal mobility and quality of life. Lower spinal decompression is considered the mainstay of surgical treatment. In this procedure, the ligamentum flavum is first removed, followed by the removal of the superior facet osteophyte in the spinal canal, and then the decompression of the spinal nerve root. Another surgical method of decompression is the Fenestration method, which involves creating a small window in the spinal canal and then decompressing the nerves. Alternative surgical options include the use of interspinous process spacers, minimally invasive lumbar decompression (MILD) procedure, laminectomy, microdiscectomy and placement of a spinal cord stimulator. The MILD procedure aims to relieve spinal cord compression by percutaneous removal of portions of the ligamentum flavum and lamina. Laminectomy also involves partial or complete removal and sacrifice of the lamina, but in addition, facets in one or more segments of the spinal cord are usually sacrificed as well. Microdiscectomy is another surgical alternative which uses small incisions, and a miniature camera for viewing, to enter the spinal cord and release pressure on the nerve roots. Laminoplasty and spinal fusion surgeries are other alternative surgical procedures that can be performed. However, they are relatively new methods which still require more research and advancements in order for it to be safely performed with minimal risks.

The use of interspinous spacers is associated with increased costs and rates of reoperation, while evidence comparing effectiveness of the MILD procedure to spinal decompression is insufficient. The effectiveness of laminectomy, microdiscectomy, laminoplasty and spinal fusion surgeries as an alternative to spinal decompression has also been heavily debated, with studies showing conflicting results. While studies show that surgery improves walking ability, minimizes constant pain and improves quality of life, comparisons between the efficacy of surgical and nonsurgical treatment of LSS have yielded mixed results.

== Prognosis ==
Individuals with LSS may be asymptomatic for many years before developing symptoms such as NC. However, most LSS patients that present with NC often seek medical help and treatment due to the condition causing pain and affecting their quality of life. Consequently, the prognosis of untreated LSS and NC has not been well reported and is unknown. Based on the physiological cause of NC, it is projected that the symptoms of NC can worsen over time, with roughly one-third of patients showing signs of improvement with time.

For NC patients that develop worse symptoms over time, severe consequences can occur. Over time, untreated NC and LSS can lead to chronic pain and muscle weakness. In severe cases, caudea equina syndrome can develop, disrupting sensory and motor function in the lower body and bladder. Consequently, disability in the lower extremities may develop over time in individuals with untreated NC and LSS. Whilst some patients may recover and improve their NC condition over time, without the help of medical treatment or interventions, this is only prevalent in individuals with light or very mild symptoms of NC. In most scenarios, the prognosis of NC can lead to potential disability, muscle weakness or constant pain in the lower body.

== Epidemiology ==
NC is a noncommunicable condition and thus, does not pose any community risks in terms of infectiousness. Rather, NC is associated with increasing age and mostly affects individuals over the age of 60. Age is a major contributing factor to the onset of NC due to spinal degenerative changes that are brought by aging and the weakening of bones and ligaments in the lumbar area. NC is also more likely present in individuals with other spinal comorbidities. A history of spinal injuries or deformities is also a contributing factor to the increased likelihood of the onset of NC. Other factors such as exercise and bone density have also been found to be associated with NC. Increased exercise activity in the form of strength training has also been found to increase bone density, muscle strength and thus, decrease the likelihood of NC as aging occurs.

One of the main causes of NC is the onset of LSS in elderly patients. Relative to their respective age groups, 16% of individuals aged less than 40 experience LSS whilst 38.8% of individuals aged over 60 experience LSS. Between the ages of 60 and 69, the prevalence of LSS relative to this population group is 47.2%. Data obtained from medical practitioners suggest that the incidence of LSS is 5 cases per 100 000. This increased prevalence of LSS as a consequence of aging, heavily contributes to the epidemiology and acquiring of NC. Among individuals with spinal stenosis, NC is present in greater than 90% of patients and present in almost half of patients that present with low back pain, with over 200,000 people being affected in the United States. The prevalence of NC and spinal stenosis in elderly men is also evident, with studies finding that roughly 1 in 10 elderly men experience leg pain in combination with low back pain (symptoms of NC) and this incidence rate is also doubled in retirement communities. As the global life expectancy increases, the impact of spinal disease symptoms such as NC is likely to increase.

== Current research ==
Current treatment options for NC are not diverse and lack extensive and detailed research to support their effectiveness, resulting in patients having to choose from a small pool of treatment options, some of which may not be effective. This lack of evidence to support the effectiveness of treatment options for NC is especially prevalent in nonsurgical treatments, such as physical therapy and medications. Among surgical interventions for NC, current research into improving methods of surgery to minimize post-surgery complication and to improve quality of life have also been of concern.

=== Physical therapy ===
Studies have found that physical therapies such as stretches and strengthening exercises have yielded mixed results in terms of its effectiveness in treating NC. Reports have shown that physical therapy does aid in treating NC in patients with light to mild symptoms, whilst others have shown the contrary. It has also been found that patients with more severe symptoms of NC find less long-term success in treating the condition through physical therapy. Thus, doctors have concluded that further research into the effectiveness of physical therapy as a treatment option for NC is necessary. With more detailed research, doctors will then be able to suggest the best treatment options for their patients, to help them recover from the condition.

=== Medications ===
Medications commonly prescribed to NC patients are generally steroids, pain relievers or anti-inflammatories that aim to reduce pain and provide pain-relief. However, studies have found that these medications only provide temporary relief for patients, and do not provide a permanent solution, with symptoms often reoccurring several months following the disuse of medications. Hence, doctors have reported that it is important to research possible medications that can provide long term relief or a permanent solution for patients. Currently, Tanezumab, a monoclonal antibody that suppresses nerve activity, has been in development for use in patents with back pain, such as NC. The drug functions by selectively targeting and inhibiting nerve growth factors (NGF) in the body. By blocking NGF in the body, Tanezumab aims to prevent pain signals produced in the body from reaching the brain, thus reducing pain and providing relief for patients. Whilst positive results have been shown in several studies, further research is still necessary for its safe and effective use.

=== Surgical procedures ===
Whilst surgical procedures exist to treat NC, current methods involve partial or complete removal of the lamina and segments of the spinal cord, leading to poor stability. Hence, orthopedic surgeons and neurosurgeons have been developing and researching other surgical techniques that reduce this side effect. Haruo Tsuji, in 1990, introduced a procedure known as laminoplastie en bloc (expansive laminoplasty) as an alternative to laminectomy and since then, variations and further developments have been made on that procedure, with developments still being currently. This procedure involves a reconstruction of the vertebral lamina such that it creates a hinge on one side, allowing for decreased pressure on spinal nerve roots. Advances in this procedure involve finding ways to access the spinal cord with minimal incisions and to more effectively create hinges that replicate normal functioning of the spine. In addition to laminoplasty, spinal fusion surgeries have also been of growing interest to orthopedic surgeons and neurosurgeons. This process involves connecting two vertebrae of the bones together to reduce pain or correct any spinal deformities. As such this form of surgery has the potential to treat the underlying cause of NC. However, these types of surgeries are difficult and dangerous to perform due to the sensitive nature of the spinal area. Additionally, these techniques are relatively new and thus, more research and advances in its methodology is still required for it to be considered a reliable and viable option to treat NC patients.

== See also ==
- Lumbar spinal stenosis
- Spondylosis
- Spinal disease
- Lumbar disc disease
- Claudication
- Orthopedic surgery
- Neurosurgery
