= Cervical spinal stenosis =

Narrowing of the upper spinal canal

- A human vertebral column
- Specialty: Orthopedic

Cervical spinal stenosis is a bone disease involving the narrowing of the spinal canal at the level of the neck. It is frequently due to chronic degeneration, but may also be congenital. Treatment is frequently surgical.

Cervical spinal stenosis is one of the most common forms of spinal stenosis, along with lumbar spinal stenosis (which occurs at the level of the lower back instead of the neck). Thoracic spinal stenosis, at the level of the mid-back, is much less common. Cervical spinal stenosis can be far more dangerous by compressing the spinal cord. Cervical canal stenosis may lead to serious symptoms such as major body weakness and paralysis. Such severe spinal stenosis symptoms are virtually absent in lumbar stenosis, however, as the spinal cord terminates at the top end of the adult lumbar spine, with only nerve roots (cauda equina) continuing further down.

== Treatments ==
=== Nonsurgical treatment ===
Potential nonsurgical treatments include:

- Education about the course of the condition and how to relieve symptoms
- Medicines to relieve pain and inflammation, such as acetaminophen or nonsteroidal anti-inflammatory drugs (NSAIDs)
- Exercise, to maintain or achieve overall good health, aerobic exercise, strength training muscles that support the neck and spine, core exercises, and posture correction.
- Weight loss, to relieve symptoms and slow the progression of the stenosis
- Physical therapy, to provide education, instruction, and support for self-care; physical therapy instructs on stretching and strength exercises that may lead to a decrease in pain and other symptoms

=== Surgery ===
Potential surgical treatments include:

- Anterior cervical discectomy and fusion – A surgical treatment of nerve root or spinal cord compression by decompressing the spinal cord and nerve roots of the cervical spine with a discectomy to stabilize the corresponding vertebrae.
- Laminoplasty – A surgical procedure to relieve pressure on the spinal cord by cutting the lamina on both sides of the affected vertebrae (cutting through on one side and merely cutting a groove on the other) and then "swinging" the freed flap of bone open.
- Laminectomy – A surgical procedure in which the lamina of the vertebra is removed or trimmed to widen the spinal canal and create more space for the spinal nerves and thecal sac.

== See also ==
- Spinal stenosis
