= Trapped nerve (disambiguation) =

Trapped nerve may refer to:

- Compression neuropathy, entrapment of a nerve in the arm or leg
- Compressive radiculopathy, entrapment of a nerve root in the spine (in the neck or back), often caused by a slipped disc
