= Lumbar spinal stenosis =

Narrowing of the lower spinal canal

- Other names: wear and tear in the spine
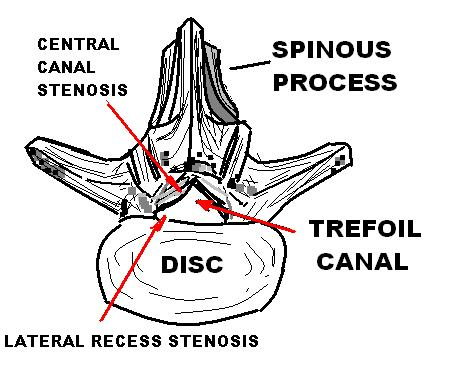
- Lumbar vertebra showing central stenosis and lateral recess stenosis.
- Specialty: Orthopedics
- Symptoms: Pain, numbness, or weakness in the low back, buttocks, or legs typically worsened with prolonged walking or standing and relieved with sitting or lying down
- Usual onset: Gradual (months to years)
- Types: Congenital, acquired
- Causes: Narrowed spinal cord due to spinal degeneration or abnormal anatomy
- Diagnostic method: Clinical (a combination of history, physical examination, and imaging)
- Differential diagnosis: Claudication from peripheral artery disease
- Treatment: Medication, physiotherapy, injections, surgery

Lumbar spinal stenosis (LSS) is a medical condition in which the spinal canal narrows and compresses the nerves and blood vessels at the level of the lumbar vertebrae. Spinal stenosis may also affect the cervical or thoracic region, in which case it is known as cervical spinal stenosis or thoracic spinal stenosis. Lumbar spinal stenosis can cause pain in the low back or buttocks, abnormal sensations, and the absence of sensation (numbness) in the legs, thighs, feet, or buttocks, or loss of bladder and bowel control.

The precise cause of LSS is unclear. Narrowing of spinal structures in the spinal cord such as the central canal, the lateral recesses, or the intervertebral foramen (the opening where a spinal nerve root passes) must be present, but are not sufficient to cause LSS alone. Many people who undergo MRI imaging are found to have such changes but have no symptoms. These changes are commonly seen in people who have spinal degeneration that occurs with aging (e.g., spinal disc herniation). LSS may also be caused by osteophytes, osteoporosis, a tumor, trauma, or various skeletal dysplasias, such as with pseudoachondroplasia and achondroplasia.

Medical professionals may clinically diagnose lumbar spinal stenosis using a combination of a thorough medical history, physical examination, and imaging (CT or MRI). EMG may be helpful if the diagnosis is unclear. Useful clues that support a diagnosis of LSS are age, radiating leg pain that worsens with prolonged standing or walking (neurogenic claudication) and is relieved by sitting, lying down, or bending forward at the waist, and a wide stance when walking. Other helpful clues may include objective weakness or decreased sensation in the legs, decreased reflexes in the legs, and balance difficulties, all of which are strongly associated with LSS. Most people with LSS qualify for initial conservative non-operative treatment. Nonsurgical treatments include medications, physiotherapy, and injection procedures. Decompressive spinal surgery may modestly improve outcomes but carries greater risk than conservative treatment. Overall, there is limited supporting evidence to determine the most effective surgical or nonsurgical treatment for people with symptomatic LSS. Evidence to support the use of acupuncture is also limited.

Lumbar spinal stenosis is a common condition and causes substantial morbidity and disability. It is the most common reason people over the age of 65 pursue spinal surgery. The condition affects over 200,000 people in the United States.

== Signs and symptoms ==
Understanding the meaning of signs and symptoms of lumbar stenosis requires an understanding of what the syndrome is, and the prevalence of the condition. A review of lumbar stenosis in the Journal of the American Medical Association's "Rational Clinical Examination Series" emphasized that the syndrome can be considered when lower extremity pain occurs in combination with back pain. The syndrome occurs in 12% of older community-dwelling men and up to 21% of those in retirement communities.

Because the leg symptoms in lumbar spinal stenosis (LSS) are similar to those found with vascular claudication, the term pseudoclaudication is often used for symptoms of LSS. These symptoms include pain, weakness, and tingling of the legs, which may radiate down the legs to the feet. Additional symptoms in the legs may be fatigue, heaviness, weakness, a sensation of tingling, pricking, or numbness, and leg cramps, as well as bladder symptoms. Symptoms are most commonly bilateral and symmetrical, but they may be unilateral; leg pain is usually more troubling than back pain.

Pseudoclaudication, now generally referred to as neurogenic claudication, typically worsens with standing or walking, and improves with sitting, and is often related to posture and lumbar extension. Lying on the side is often more comfortable than lying flat, since it permits greater lumbar flexion. Vascular claudication can resemble spinal stenosis, and some individuals experience unilateral or bilateral symptoms radiating down the legs rather than true claudication.

The first symptoms of stenosis include bouts of low back pain. After a few months or years, this may progress to claudication. The pain may be radicular, following the classic neurologic pathways. This occurs as the spinal nerves or spinal cord become increasingly trapped in a smaller space within the canal. Determining whether pain in the elderly is caused by lack of blood supply or stenosis is difficult; testing can usually differentiate between them, but patients can have both vascular disease in the legs and spinal stenosis.

Among people with lower-extremity pain in combination with back pain, lumbar stenosis as the cause is two times more likely in those older than 70 years of age, while in those younger than 60 years, it is less than half as likely. The character of the pain is also useful for diagnosis. When the discomfort does not occur while seated, the likelihood of lumbar spinal stenosis increases considerably, around 7.4 times. Other features increasing the likelihood of lumbar stenosis are improvement in symptoms on bending forward (6.4 times), pain that occurs in both buttocks or legs (6.3 times), and the presence of neurogenic claudication (3.7 times). On the other hand, the absence of neurogenic claudication makes lumbar stenosis much less likely as the explanation for the pain.

== Causes ==
Spinal stenosis may be congenital (rarely) or acquired (degenerative), overlapping changes normally seen in the aging spine. Stenosis can occur as either central stenosis (the narrowing of the entire canal) or foraminal stenosis (the narrowing of the foramen through which the nerve root exits the spinal canal). Severe narrowing of the lateral portion of the canal is called lateral recess stenosis. The ligamentum flavum (yellow ligament), an important structural component intimately adjacent to the posterior portion of the dural sac (nerve sac) can become thickened and cause stenosis. The articular facets, also in the posterior portion of the bony spine can become thickened and enlarged, causing stenosis. These changes are often called "trophic changes" or "facet trophism" in radiology reports, sometimes forming a facet cyst. As the canal becomes smaller, resembling a triangular shape, it is called a "trefoil" canal.

=== Degenerative spondylolisthesis ===
Forward displacement of a proximal vertebra in relation to its adjacent vertebra in association with an intact neural arch, and in the presence of degenerative changes, is known as degenerative spondylolisthesis, which narrows the spinal canal, and symptoms of spinal stenosis are common. Of these, neural claudication is most common. Any forward slipping of one vertebra on another can cause spinal stenosis by narrowing the canal. If this forward slipping narrows the canal sufficiently, and impinges on the contents of the spinal column, it is spinal stenosis by definition. If associated symptoms of narrowing exist, the diagnosis of spinal stenosis is confirmed. With increasing age, the occurrence of degenerative spondylolisthesis becomes more common. The most common spondylolisthesis occurs with slipping of L4 on L5. Frymoyer showed that spondylolisthesis with canal stenosis is more common in diabetic women who have undergone oophorectomy (removal of ovaries). The cause of symptoms in the legs can be difficult to determine. A peripheral neuropathy secondary to diabetes can have the same symptoms as spinal stenosis.

=== Ankylosing spondylitis ===
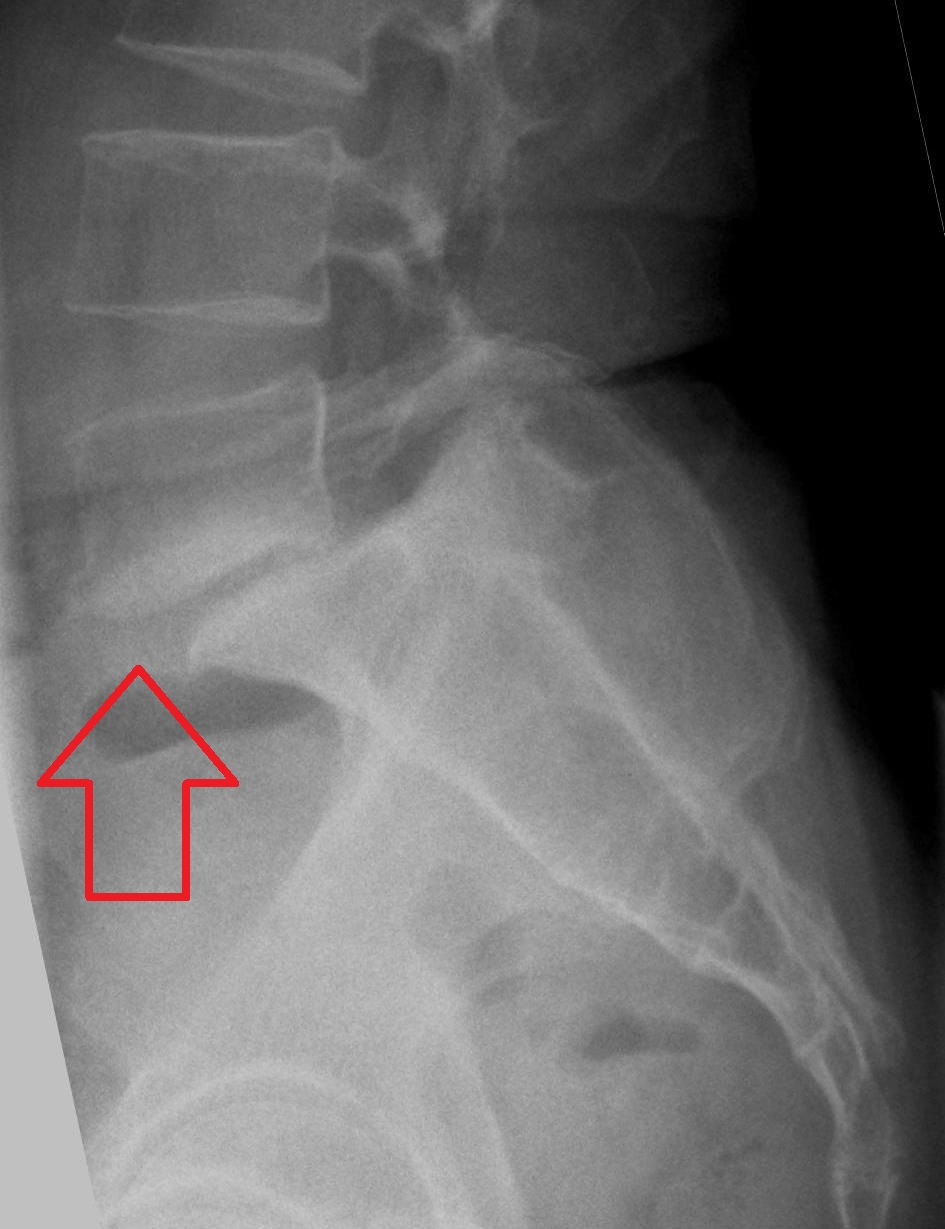
L5 S1 Spondylolisthesis Grade II with forward slipping of L5 on S1 <50%

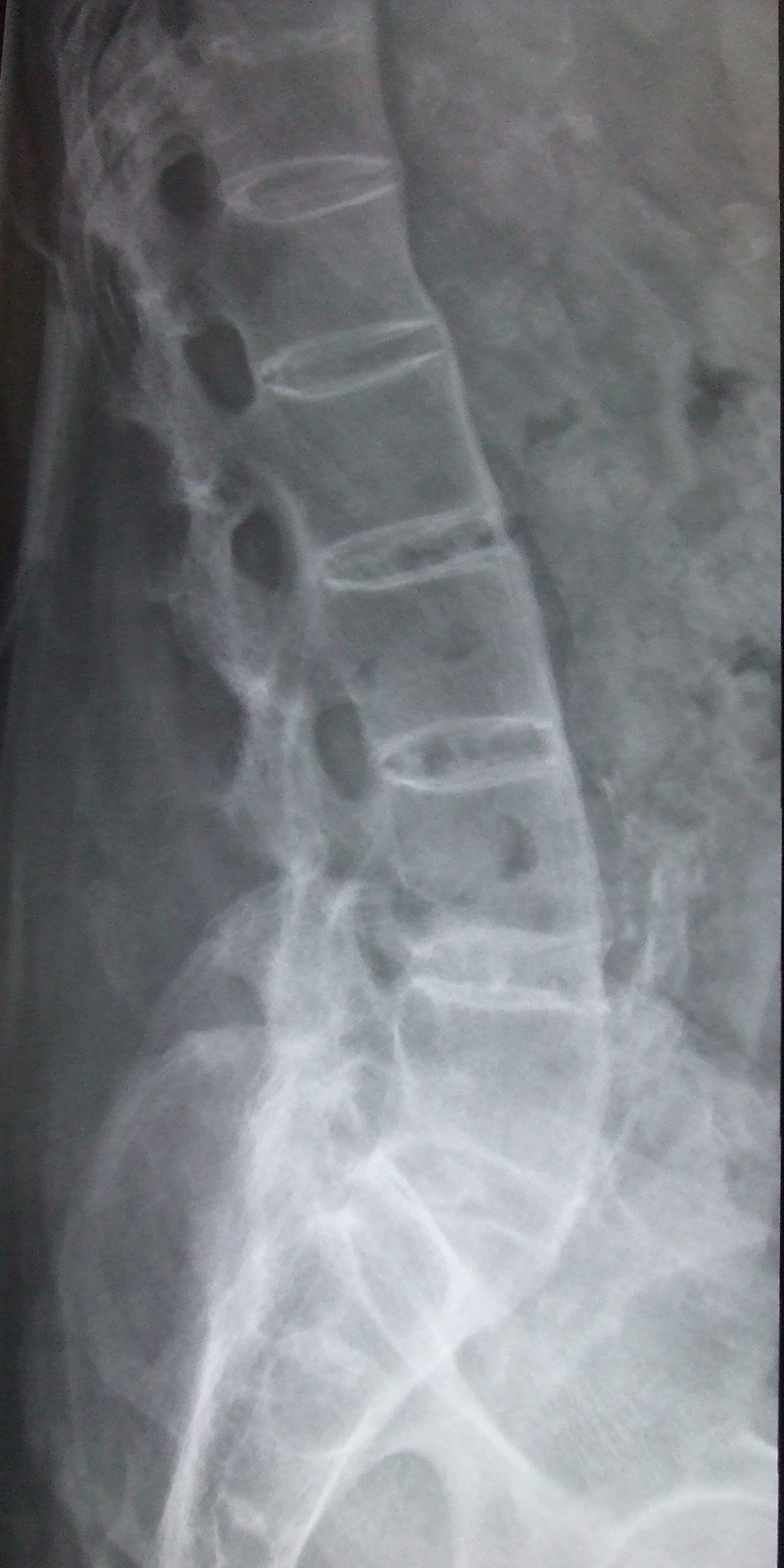
Lumbar spine showing advanced ankylosing spondylitis which can lead to spinal stenosis

== Diagnosis ==
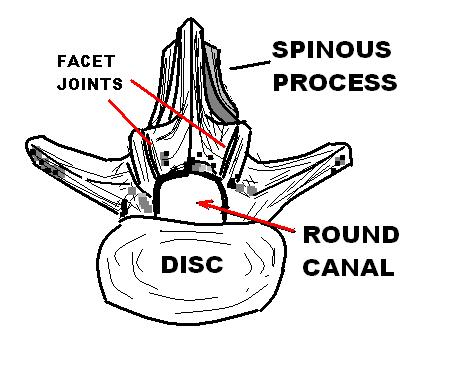
Normal lumbar vertebra showing large, round spinal canal

The diagnosis is based on clinical findings. Some patients can have a narrowed canal without symptoms, and do not require therapy.

The normal lumbar central canal has a midsagittal diameter (front to back) greater than 13 mm, with an area of 1.45 cm^{2}. Relative stenosis is said to exist when the anterior-posterior canal diameter measures between 10 and 13 mm. Absolute stenosis of the lumbar canal exists anatomically when the anterior-posterior measurement is 10 mm or less.

Plain X-rays of the lumbar or cervical spine may or may not show spinal stenosis. The definitive diagnosis is established by either computerized tomography scanning or magnetic resonance imaging (MRI). Identifying the presence of a narrowed canal makes the diagnosis of spinal stenosis.

=== Bicycle test of van Gelderen ===
In 1977, Dyck and Doyle reported on the bicycle test, a simple procedure in which the patient is asked to pedal on a stationary bicycle. If the symptoms are caused by peripheral artery disease, the patient will experience claudication, a sensation of not getting enough blood to the legs; if the symptoms are caused by lumbar stenosis, symptoms will be relieved when the patient is leaning forward while bicycling. Although diagnostic progress has been made with newer technical advances, the bicycle test remains an inexpensive and easy way to distinguish between claudication caused by vascular disease and spinal stenosis.

=== MRI ===
MRI of a lumbar spinal stenosis L4-L5. L4-L5 antherolisthesis of grade I. Hypertrophy of interspinous ligaments in relation to Baastrup's disease. 67 years old man.

MRI is the preferred method of diagnosing and evaluating spinal stenosis of all areas of the spine, including cervical, thoracic, and lumbar. MRI is useful to diagnose cervical spondylotic myelopathy (degenerative arthritis of the cervical spine with associated damage to the spinal cord). The finding of degeneration of the cervical spinal cord on MRI can be ominous; the condition is called myelomalacia or cord degeneration. It is seen as an increased signal on the MRI. In myelopathy (pathology of the spinal cord) from degenerative changes, the findings are usually permanent and decompressive laminectomy will not reverse the pathology. Surgery can stop the progression of the condition. In cases where the MRI changes are due to vitamin B_{12} deficiency, a brighter prospect for recovery can be expected.

=== Establishing the diagnosis ===
The detection of spinal stenosis in the cervical, thoracic, or lumbar spine confirms only the anatomic presence of a stenotic condition. This may or may not correlate with the diagnosis of spinal stenosis which is based on clinical findings of radiculopathy, neurogenic claudication, weakness, bowel and bladder dysfunction, spasticity, motor weakness, hyperreflexia and muscular atrophy. These findings, taken from the history and physical examination of the patient (along with the anatomic demonstration of stenosis with an MRI or CT scan), establish the diagnosis.

== Management ==
Nonoperative therapies and laminectomy are the standard treatment for LSS. A trial of conservative treatment is typically recommended. Individuals are generally advised to avoid stressing the lower back, particularly with the spine extended. A physical-therapy program to provide core strengthening and aerobic conditioning may be recommended. Overall scientific evidence is inconclusive on whether conservative approach or a surgical treatment is better for lumbar spinal stenosis.

=== Medication ===
The evidence for the use of medical interventions for LSS is poor. Injectable but not nasal calcitonin may be useful for short-term pain relief. Epidural blocks may also transiently decrease pain, but no evidence of long-term effect has been found. Adding corticosteroids to these injections does not improve the result; the use of epidural steroid injections is controversial and evidence of their efficacy is contradictory.

Nonsteroidal anti-inflammatory drugs, muscle relaxants, and opioid analgesics are often used to treat low back pain, but evidence of their efficacy is lacking.

== Surgery ==
Surgery may be considered when conservative treatments—including physical therapy and medications—fail to relieve symptoms after three to six months. The primary goal is neural decompression, with the choice of surgical technique tailored to the patient's condition, comorbidities, and surgeon's evaluation.

=== Decompression Only ===
This approach relieves nerve compression without stabilizing the spine.

- Laminectomy: Removal of part or all of the lamina to enlarge the spinal canal.
- Laminotomy: Partial removal targeting specific nerve roots.
- Foraminotomy: Enlargement of the neural foramen to relieve exiting nerve roots.

=== Decompression with Fusion ===
Indicated for cases with spinal instability (such as spondylolisthesis) or when wide decompression could destabilize the spine. Fusion secures vertebrae using bone grafts and instrumentation, providing stability but sacrificing motion and increasing risks of adjacent segment disease, longer recovery, and higher complications. Randomized controlled trials suggest that decompression with fusion does not provide additional long-term benefit compared to decompression alone, while incurring greater costs.

=== Motion Preservation ===
These techniques aim to decompress while preserving spinal mobility.

- Interspinous Process Devices (IPDs): Devices like X-STOP act as spacers between spinous processes. A four-year follow-up of an FDA IDE trial showed sustained functional improvement in most patients; however, randomized studies and meta-analyses raise questions about cost-effectiveness and durability, often favoring decompression alone.
- Artificial Disc Replacement (ADR): In selected patients—usually younger, active individuals without instability—ADR replaces the degenerated disc with an implant, aiming to maintain motion. A 2024 meta-analysis of randomized controlled trials and other studies found that ADR and fusion have similar outcomes in operative metrics, complications, and reoperation rates; ADR showed a modest advantage in reducing back pain. Long-term cohort data demonstrate sustained improvements in pain, function, and motion preservation, though critics note that findings across trials may be statistically fragile.
- Total Facet Replacement: This procedure is generally indicated for patients with lumbar spinal stenosis and up to grade I spondylolisthesis; higher-grade instability typically requires fusion. Total Facet Replacement involves removal of the facet joints after decompression and their replacement with an implant intended to maintain spinal stability and mobility. The TOPS System (Premia Spine) is a facet replacement device with FDA and CE approval. In multicenter randomized controlled trials, TOPS demonstrated significantly higher rates of clinical success compared with fusion at two years. FDA approval included labeling that indicated superiority to fusion in clinical outcomes. Health-economic analyses have reported cost-effectiveness of the device. Long-term follow-up studies suggest that it preserves near-normal motion and may reduce the risk of adjacent segment disease.

== Prognosis ==
Most people with mild to moderate symptoms do not get worse. While many improve in the short term after surgery, this improvement decreases somewhat with time. A number of factors present before surgery are able to predict the outcome after surgery, with people with depression, cardiovascular disease, and scoliosis doing in general worse, while those with more severe stenosis beforehand and better overall health doing better.

The natural evolution of disc disease and degeneration leads to stiffening of the intervertebral joint. This leads to osteophyte formation—a bony overgrowth about the joint. This process is called spondylosis, and is part of the normal aging of the spine. This has been seen in studies of normal and diseased spines. Degenerative changes begin to occur without symptoms as early as age 25–30 years. Not uncommonly, people experience at least one severe case of low back pain by the age of 35. This can be expected to improve and become less prevalent as the individual develops osteophyte formation around the discs.

In the US workers' compensation system, once the threshold of two major spinal surgeries is reached, the vast majority of workers never return to any form of gainful employment. Beyond two spinal surgeries, any more are likely to make the patient worse, not better.

== Epidemiology ==
There are many causes for spinal stenosis but degenerative changes are a precursor to spinal stenosis becoming symptomatic. While the exact prevalence of degenerative LSS is unknown, it is estimated that it ranges from 1.7% to 13.1%. However, the results from these statistics have been put into question. This is mainly due to unclear diagnostic criteria. For example, magnetic resonance imaging (MRI) and computed tomography (CT) are the most common ways to diagnosis LSS, but clinically significant definitions of canal, foraminal, or subarticular narrowing do not exist.

In addition to this, the lumbar and cervical types are more common than the rarer thoracic stenosis. Although stenosis can be found isolated in one region of the spine, developmental spinal stenosis will most likely involve both the cervical and lumbar sections.

The age that people develop spinal stenosis is correlated with change in the joint's biomechanics. Because of this, there has been a recent increasing trend seen by physicians, of lumbar spinal stenosis being more commonly diagnosed in older patients. Low back pain accounts for 17% of all physician visits of people aged 65 and older. From this population, a large portion of radicular pain stems not from disk pathology, but from lumbar spinal stenosis. According to Kalff et al., 21% of people over the age of 60 have lumbar spinal stenosis, as confirmed by radiological screening. Degenerative lumbar spinal stenosis has been predominantly seen in the 50 to 60-year-old population. A recent study in Japan found that the incidence of LSS increases with age. The study supports that LSS incidence increases incrementally in the following age groups, 1.7–2.2% in 40–49 years old population, and 10.3%–11.2% in 70–79 years old population. It is estimated that around 200,000 adults are affected by LSS in the United States and that by the year 2025, this number will rise to 64 million elderly. The syndrome occurs in 12% of older community-dwelling men and up to 21% of those in retirement communities.

Spinal stenosis generally affects more men than women. A study in Geneva found that the ratio between men and women is 1.28. It went on to state that while the disease is strongly related to aging, men are affected earlier in life than women. This is likely due to heavy workload and a higher body mass index (BMI). Although spinal stenosis tends to affect men more than women, degenerative spondylolisthesis in association with spinal stenosis is more prevalent in women. Occupation, race, and smaller canal diameter also do not appear to have a correlation with the development of spinal stenosis.

Furthermore, there is now a disproportionate rise in spinal surgery being performed. The incidence in the 1980s in Sweden was 5 per 100,000 people and increased 300% between 1987 and 1999. Again in 2013, Sweden reported an incidence of 40 per 100,000 people. The large increase in surgical treatment for this disease is well known and studied. The United States has also followed similar trends.

== History ==
A description of LSS was published by Sachs and Frankel in 1900, but the first clinical description of LSS is usually attributed to the Dutch neurosurgeon Henk Verbiest, whose report appeared in 1954.

Spinal stenosis began to be recognized as an impairing condition in the 1950s and 1970s. Individuals who experience back pain and other symptoms are likely to have bigger spinal canals than those who are asymptomatic. A normal-sized lumbar canal is rarely encountered in persons with either disc disease or those requiring a laminectomy.

During the 1970s and 1980s, many case reports showed successful surgical treatment rates, but these were based on subjective assessment by surgeons. In 1992, Johnsson, Rosén and Udén described the natural history of LSS, with different conclusions about prognosis and treatment: "70% of patients reported no significant change in symptoms, 15% showed significant improvement, whereas 15% showed some deterioration. The investigators concluded that observation is a reasonable treatment option for lumbar stenosis and that significant neurologic deterioration is rare."

== Society and culture ==
=== United States ===
Under rules promulgated by Titles II and XVI of the United States Social Security Act, spinal stenosis is recognized as a disabling condition under Listing 1.04 C. The listing states: "Lumbar spinal stenosis resulting in neurogenic claudication, established by findings on appropriate medically acceptable imaging, manifested by chronic nonradicular pain and weakness, and resulting in inability to ambulate effectively, as defined in 1.00B2b." The regulation is written specifically for lumbar stenosis.
