= Lumbar disc disease =

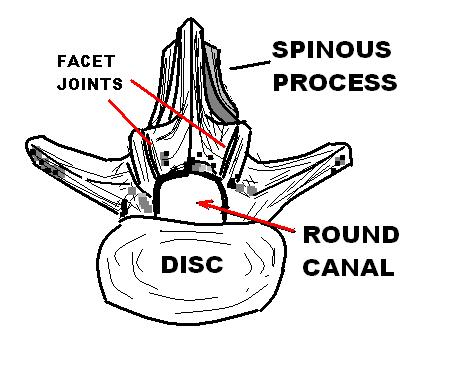
- Lumbar disc

Lumbar disc disease is the drying out of the spongy interior matrix of an intervertebral disc in the spine. Many physicians and patients use the term lumbar disc disease to encompass several different causes of back pain or sciatica. In this article, the term is used to describe a lumbar herniated disc. It is thought that lumbar disc disease causes about one-third of all back pain.

== Symptoms ==
Pain, loss of muscle strength and loss of touch sensation may occur if this herniation causes the compression of the most proximal part of the nerve closely neighbouring the intervertebral disc material. Pain is in the distribution of the nerve compressed, usually down the back of the leg, side of the calf and inside of the foot (sciatica). Most commonly, the nerve root between the fourth and fifth lumbar vertebrae or between the fifth lumbar vertebra and first sacral segment are impinged.

In symptomatic cases the diagnosis should be confirmed by an MRI scan. However, in cases with slight symptoms, a faster and cheaper CT scan (although it is inferior to MRI scan) may be recommended. While a CT scan can show the bony structures in more detail, an MRI scan can better portray soft tissue.

== Genetics ==
An inheritable gene variation may cause increased susceptibility. People with a variation in a gene that encodes the cartilage intermediate-layer protein (CILP) were 1.6 times more likely to have the disease than persons without the variation. CILP is a normal component of disc tissue. The gene variant was hypothesized to disrupt normal building and maintenance of cartilage. However, this association was not replicated in a follow-up study of Finnish and Chinese individuals.

== Diagnosis ==
Diagnosis can be made on clinical basis with MRI findings

== Treatment ==
Initial treatment in lumbar disc disease is one or two days of bedrest (although growing number of studies shows that it makes little difference) and pain relieving medications. In cases with ongoing pain despite conservative treatments, a surgical operation that will remove the compressing disc material, a microdiscectomy or discectomy may be recommended to treat a lumbar disc herniation.

== See also ==
- Degenerative disc disease
- Lumbar spinal stenosis
- Sciatica
- Spinal disc herniation
