= Klyce =

Klyce is a surname. Notable people with the surname include:

- Henry A. Klyce (born c. 1948), American entrepreneur, inventor, businessman, musician, and philanthropist
- Ren Klyce, American sound designer
- Scudder Klyce (1879–1933), American philosopher
