= Spurling's test =

Medical maneuver used to assess nerve root pain

- Purpose: assess nerve root pain

The Spurling test is a medical maneuver used to assess nerve root pain (also known as radicular pain).

== Procedure ==
The patient rotates their head to the affected side and extends their neck, while the examiners applies downward pressure to the top of the patient's head.

A positive Spurling's sign is characterized by neck pain that radiates along the corresponding dermatome ipsilaterally. It is a type of cervical compression test.

Patients with a positive Spurling's sign can present with a variety of symptoms, including pain, numbness and weakness. In addition to the clinical history, the neurological examination may show signs suggesting a cervical radiculopathy.

== Indications ==
The Spurling test is used during a spinal or neck examination to aid in the diagnosis and assessment of cervical radiculopathy. It should be used to assess patients with radicular symptoms. The results of this test can guide a clinician when considering further imaging and necessary steps needed to make a proper diagnosis.

However, caution should be used when assessing patients with acute cervical injuries, critically ill patients, and those with other neoplastic or infectious processes. Cervical instability is also a reason to avoid performing this medical maneuver.

== Accuracy ==
Spurling's test is somewhat specific when used for individuals with an abnormal electromyogram study and is a relatively sensitive physical examination maneuver in diagnosing cervical spondylosis or acute cervical radiculopathy. It is not a very sensitive test when used for individuals without classic radicular signs suggestive of cervical radiculopathy. In 2011, one study evaluated 257 patients with clinical cervical radiculopathy and correlated CT scan findings with clinical exam findings using the Spurling's test. The Spurling's test was 95% sensitive and 94% specific for diagnosing nerve root pathology.

In another study done in the late 1900s, 255 patients were examined using a Spurling test and afterwards received an electrodiagnostic examination. The study results showed the Spurling test was 30% sensitive, and 93% specific for finding cervical radiculopathy diagnosed by electrodiagnostic examination. The conclusions drawn from this study demonstrate clinical utility of the Spurling test to confirm cervical radiculopathy rather than for screening purposes. Overall, there continues to be limited data on the specificity and sensitivity of the Spurling test.
