= Henry A. Klyce =

American serial entrepreneur

Henry Arnold Klyce, Jr. (born c. 1948) is an American serial entrepreneur who has founded, or co-founded, four successful medical device companies.

== Early life and education ==
Klyce was born and raised in Memphis, Tennessee, the fourth of six children born to Henry Arnold Klyce and Mary Byrd (Perrow) Klyce. He holds a Bachelor of Arts degree from Cornell University.

== Career ==
In 1981 he co-founded Medical Instrument Development Laboratories. The company specialized in developing and manufacturing ophthalmic surgical devices, specifically for retinal diseases. MID Labs was acquired in 1985 by Alcon.

In 1985 Klyce founded Surgical Dynamics, a privately held company that developed, manufactured and marketed surgical devices for orthopedics and neurosurgery, with a specific emphasis on spine surgery. Surgical Dynamics developed several innovative minimally invasive spinal products. In November 1995, Surgical Dynamics was acquired by U. S. Surgical.

In 1994 Klyce co-founded Operating Room Recovery and Instrument Services (ORRIS), based in Houston, Texas. In 1998 ORRIS merged with Applied Medical Technologies to form Alliance Medical Corporation, where he served as chairman of the board. Also in 2001, Alliance Medical filed S1 registration document for an IPO of its common stock, market conditions were not favorable and the IPO was withdrawn. Since then Alliance acquired Sterile Reprocessing Services, Inc., in 1998 and Paragon Healthcare Corporation, in 2001. In 2005 Alliance merged with Vanguard to form Ascent Healthcare Solutions.

On Monday, November 30, 2009, Stryker Corporation (NYSE: SYK) announced a definitive agreement to acquire Ascent Healthcare Solutions, Inc. for $525 million in an all-cash transaction.

In 1997 Klyce founded St. Francis Medical Technologies, Inc. (SFMT) and served as its president and CEO until June, 2004, and then its chairman until November 2005. SFMT was a privately held company that developed, manufactured and marketed the X STOP Interspinous Process Decompression (IPD) System for lumbar spinal stenosis. The X STOP was approved by FDA in November 2005. In September 2006 SFMT announced that it had filed an S1 registration document with the SEC for an initial public offering of its common stock. On January 18, 2007, Kyphon Inc. (Nasdaq: KYPH) acquired St. Francis for $525 million in cash and additional contingent payments of up to $200 million. On August 23, 2007, Kyphon completed its payment of more than $200 million as a direct result of its own acquisition by Medtronic.

In 2007 Klyce founded Spartek Medical, Inc, a developer of spinal implants.

Klyce is listed as an inventor in over seventy patents.

== Personal life ==
Klyce and his wife Carole have three children.
