= Nasya =

Type of Panchakarma treatment

Nasya is a Panchakarma treatment for body cleansing used in Ayurvedic medicine. Administration of drugs by the route of nasal cavity is termed as nasya, nāvana, nasya karma, etcetera are synonymous to nasya. Randomized controlled clinical trials have shown reduction in the signs and symptoms of cervical spondylosis by nasya. Clinical trials of nasya have been carried out for myopia. Pradhamana nasya is used by ayurvedic physicians and have been found useful to treat chronic sinusitis. Nasya is a sanskrit word, which means " related to nose". So in this Nasya therapy, ayurveda treatment is performed through the nostril. Ayurvedic medicine either in the oil or smoke forms is infused into the nostrils. Nasya panchakarma therapy is very useful to address the disease related to head region, e.g. insomnia, stress, anxiety, early greying of hair, allergies.

== See also ==
- Ayurveda
- Panchakarma
