= Interspinous process decompression =

Minimally invasive surgical procedure

- Specialty: Orthopaedic spine surgeon

Interspinous process decompression, or IPD, is a minimally invasive surgical procedure in which an implant is placed between the spinous processes of the symptomatic disc levels. IPD's were developed for patients who have lumbar spinal stenosis, suffer symptoms of neurogenic intermittent claudication, and who are able to relieve their symptoms when they bend forward or flex their spines.

These devices are designed to limit pathologic extension of the spinal segments and maintain them in a neutral or slightly flexed position, which may allow patients to resume their normal posture rather than flex the entire spine to gain symptom relief.
