= Artificial facet replacement =

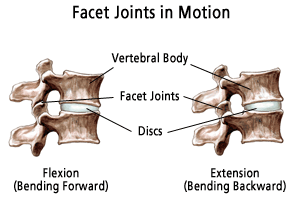
Research is ongoing in the efficacy determination of artificial replacements for the facet joints of the human spine.

An artificial facet replacement is a joint prosthesis intended to replace the natural facets and other posterior elements of the spine, restoring normal (or near-normal) motion while providing stabilization of spinal segments. It is typically used as an adjunct to laminectomy, laminotomy, neural decompression, and facetectomy, in lieu of standard lumbar fusion. The prosthesis is indicated for back and leg pain caused by central or lateral spinal stenosis, degenerative disease of the facets with instability, and grade 1 degenerative spondylolisthesis with objective evidence of neurological impairment.

== History ==
Patents related to facet replacement have been around since the 1980s; more intense research into artificial facet replacement as an effective and marketable prosthesis has been ongoing since the mid-2000s. Prominent researched options include:

- ACADIA: a facet replacement implant "designed to reproduce facet motion while restoring normal stability and motion," first tested in 2006; also known as the Anatomic Facet Replacement System (AFRS); clinical trials still ongoing as of September 2015
- TOPS: a total posterior arthroplasty system first tested in January, 2005; clinical trials completed in 2011
- TFAS: the Total Facet Anthroplasty System, a nonfusion spinal implant originally developed by Archus Orthopedics in 2005; clinical trial status unknown since February 2009, when the company was dissolved but then acquired by Facet Solutions, then Globus medical; status unknown

== Current status and efficacy ==
In 2011, in a retrospective and future analysis of the technology in the International Journal of Spine Surgery, Serhan et al. opined that artificial facet replacement still had much to prove:

In the future, facet replacement devices will require a substantial amount of validation testing and numerous clinical studies before they can be considered a viable treatment option for the treatment of spinal disorders. To date, most pathophysiologic research and thus surgical treatments have been focused on the disc as a pain generator. A more comprehensive focus on re-establishing the structure and function of the human functional spinal unit may include facet replacement. A better understanding of facet function and facet-mediated pain, possibly through classification of facet degeneration, may be needed to support the use of such devices.

More recently, an August 2014 critique in the journal Neurosurgery has suggested that research aside, at least in the United States the regulatory process has led to "time lag inherent in the design, development and implementation of new technologies" such as artificial facet replacement, noting that both ACADIA and TOPS were still not FDA-approved within the U.S.

In the short-term, study literature has provided "insufficient support" for the prosthesis, with pessimal results for the procedure. However, more long-term results (such as those from the seven-year follow-up on TOPS implants) have been encouraging, albeit limited by patient sample size.

== See also ==
- Low back pain
- Spine
