= Spinal cord compression =

- A tumour causing spinal cord compression
- Specialty: Neurosurgery

Spinal cord compression is a form of myelopathy in which the spinal cord is compressed. Causes can be bone fragments from a vertebral fracture, a tumor, abscess, ruptured intervertebral disc or other lesion.

When acute it can cause a medical emergency independent of its cause, and require swift diagnosis and treatment to prevent long-term disability due to irreversible spinal cord injury.

== Signs and symptoms ==
Symptoms suggestive of cord compression are back pain, a dermatome of increased sensation, paralysis of limbs below the level of compression, decreased sensation below the level of compression, urinary and fecal incontinence and/or urinary retention. Lhermitte's sign (intermittent shooting electrical sensation) and hyperreflexia may be present.

=== Progression ===
Typically, the symptoms of spinal cord compression develop slowly and progress steadily over several years. In some patients, however, the condition may worsen more rapidly. Subacute compression develops over days to weeks. Acute compression develops within minutes to hours. Acute compression may follow subacute and chronic compression, especially if the cause is abscess or tumor. Regardless of the pace, spinal cord compression will predictably progress over time.

== Causes ==
The most common causes of cord compression are tumors, but abscesses and granulomas (e.g. in tuberculosis) are equally capable of producing the syndrome. Tumors that commonly cause cord compression are lung cancer (non-small cell type), breast cancer, prostate cancer, renal cell carcinoma, thyroid cancer, lymphoma and multiple myeloma.

== Diagnosis ==
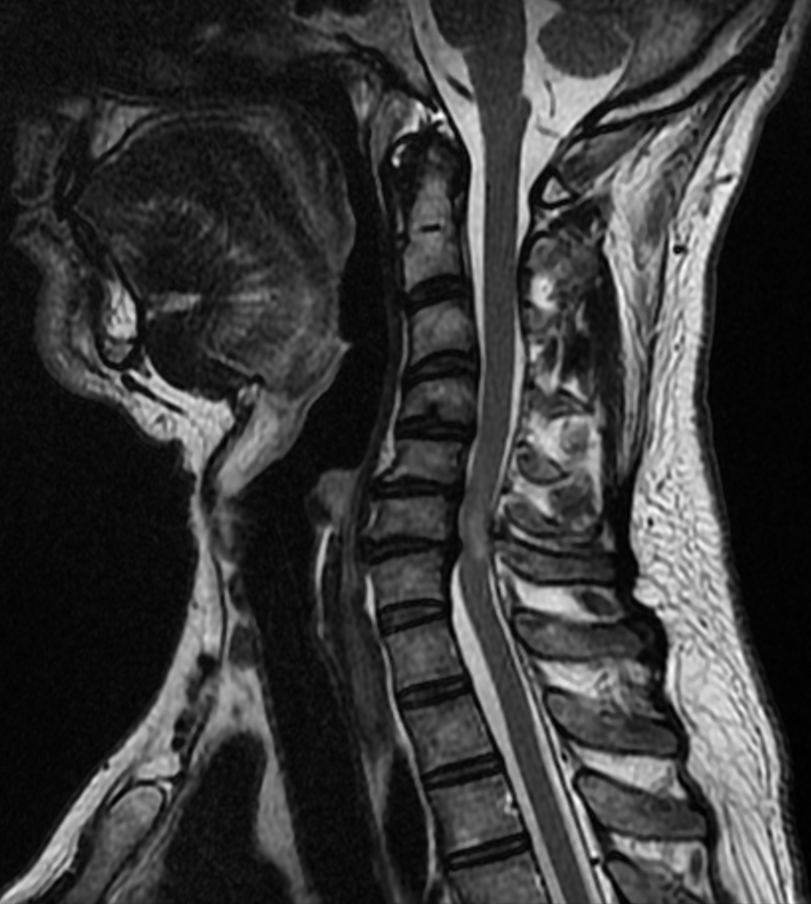
Compressive myelopathy at the C6-C7 level due to disc protrussion

Diagnosis is by X-rays but preferably magnetic resonance imaging (MRI) of the whole spine.

== Treatment ==
Dexamethasone (a potent glucocorticoid) in doses of 16 mg/day may reduce edema around the lesion and protect the cord from injury. It may be given orally or intravenously for this indication.

Surgery is indicated in localised compression as long as there is some hope of regaining function. It is also occasionally indicated in patients with little hope of regaining function but with uncontrolled pain. Postoperative radiation is delivered within 2–3 weeks of surgical decompression. Emergency radiation therapy (usually 20 grays in 5 fractions, 30 grays in 10 fractions or 8 grays in 1 fraction) is the mainstay of treatment for malignant spinal cord compression. It is very effective as pain control and local disease control. Some tumours are highly sensitive to chemotherapy (e.g. lymphomas, small-cell lung cancer) and may be treated with chemotherapy alone.

== Prognosis ==
Once complete paralysis has been present for more than about 24 hours before treatment, the chances of useful recovery are greatly diminished, although slow recovery, sometimes months after radiotherapy, is well recognised.

The median survival of patients with metastatic spinal cord compression is about 12 weeks, reflecting the generally advanced nature of the underlying malignant disease.

== See also ==
- Spinal stenosis
- Cervical spinal stenosis
- Myelopathy
