= Spinal tumor =

Neoplasms located in either the vertebral column or the spinal cord

Spinal tumors are neoplasms located in either the vertebral column or the spinal cord. There are three main types of spinal tumors classified based on their location: extradural and intradural (intradural-intramedullary and intradural-extramedullary). Extradural tumors are located outside the dura mater lining and are most commonly metastatic. Intradural tumors are located inside the dura mater lining and are further subdivided into intramedullary and extramedullary tumors. Intradural-intramedullary tumors are located within the dura and spinal cord parenchyma, while intradural-extramedullary tumors are located within the dura but outside the spinal cord parenchyma. The most common presenting symptom of spinal tumors is nocturnal back pain. Other common symptoms include muscle weakness, sensory loss, and difficulty walking. Loss of bowel and bladder control may occur during the later stages of the disease.

The cause of spinal tumors is unknown. Most extradural tumors are metastatic commonly from breast, prostate, lung, and kidney cancer. There are many genetic factors associated with intradural tumors, most commonly neurofibromatosis 1 (NF1), neurofibromatosis 2 (NF2), and Von Hippel–Lindau (VHL) syndrome. The most common type of intradural-extramedullary tumors are meningiomas and nerve-sheath tumors. Intramedullary tumors are rare, comprising 2–4% of CNS tumors The most common type of intradural-intramedullary tumors are ependymomas and astrocytomas. Diagnosis involves a complete medical evaluation followed by imaging with a CT or MRI. A biopsy may be obtained in certain cases to categorize the lesion if the diagnosis is uncertain.

Treatment often involves some combination of surgery, radiation, and chemotherapy. Observation with follow-up imaging may be an option for small, benign lesions. Steroids may also be given before surgery in cases of significant cord compression. Outcomes depend on a number of factors including whether the tumor is benign or malignant, primary or metastatic, and location of the tumor. Treatment is often palliative for the vast majority of metastatic tumors.

== Signs and symptoms ==
The symptoms of spinal tumors are often non-specific, resulting in a delay in diagnosis. Spinal nerve compression and weakening of the vertebral structure cause the symptoms. Pain is the most common symptom at presentation. Other common symptoms of spinal cord compression include muscle weakness, sensory loss, numbness in hands and legs, and rapid onset paralysis. Bowel or bladder incontinence often occur in the later stages of the disease. Children may present with spinal deformities such as scoliosis. The diagnosis is challenging, primarily because symptoms often mimic more common and benign degenerative spinal diseases.

Spinal cord compression is commonly found in patients with metastatic malignancy. Back pain is a primary symptom of spinal cord compression in patients with known malignancy. Back pain may prompt a bone scan to confirm or exclude spinal metastasis. Rapid identification and intervention of metastatic spinal cord compression is necessary to preserve neurologic function.

== Causes ==
The cause of the majority of spinal tumors is currently not known. Primary spinal tumors are associated with a few genetic syndromes. Neurofibromas are associated with neurofibromatosis 1 (NF1). Meningiomas and schwannomas are associated with neurofibromatosis 2 (NF2). Intramedullary hemangioblastomas can be seen in patients with von Hippel-Lindau disease. Spinal cord lymphomas are commonly seen in patients with suppressed immune systems. The majority of extradural tumors are due to metastasis, most commonly from breast, prostate, lung, and kidney cancer.

== Pathophysiology ==
The spinal cord is a long, cylindrical anatomical structure that is located within the vertebral cavity. It runs from the foramen magnum of the skull to the conus medullaris at the lumbar spine. Most symptoms from spinal tumors occur due to compression of the spinal cord as it plays a primary role in motor and sensory function. The spinal cord is surrounded by three layers known as the spinal meninges. These are the dura mater, arachnoid mater, and pia mater. Spinal cord tumors are classified based on their location within the spinal cord: intradural (intradmedullary and extramedullary) and extradural tumors.

Intradural tumors are located within the dura mater. These are further broken down into intramedullary and extramedullary tumors. Intradural-intramedullary tumors are located within the spinal cord itself, with the most common being ependymomas, astrocytomas, and hemangioblastomas. Intradural-extramedullary tumors are located within the dura but outside of the spinal cord parenchyma, with the most common being meningiomas and nerve sheath tumors (e.g. schwannomas, neurofibromas). Extradural tumors are located outside the dura mater most commonly in the vertebral bodies from metastatic disease.

Common primary cancers in metastatic spinal tumors includes breast, prostate, lung, and kidney cancer. It is important to diagnose and promptly treat metastatic tumors as they can lead to long-term neurologic deficit from epidural spinal cord compression. Primary extradural tumors are rare and most arise from surrounding bony and soft tissue structures, including Ewing's sarcoma, osteosarcoma, and vertebral hemangioblastomas.

== Diagnosis ==
=== Medical examination ===
The diagnosis of spinal tumors is challenging, as the symptoms can be non-specific and often mimic more common and benign degenerative spinal diseases. A comprehensive medical examination is necessary to look for signs or symptoms that may point towards a more serious condition. This includes a complete neurological exam focusing on any motor or sensory deficits. Patients with either benign degenerative spinal disease or spinal tumors often present with back pain. A patient with radiculopathy or myelopathy raises suspicion for a more serious condition.

=== Imaging ===
Imaging is often the next step when the diagnosis is unclear or there is greater suspicion for a serious condition that may need immediate intervention. Common types of medical imaging include X-rays, computer tomography scan (CT), Magnetic resonance imaging (MRI), myelography, and bone scans. MRI is the imaging of choice for spinal tumors. The MRI protocol that is most frequently used includes T1-weighted and T2-weighted sequences, including contrast enhanced T1-weighted sequences. Short-TI Inversion Recovery (STIR) is also commonly added to the MRI protocol for detecting spinal cord tumors. Myelography may be used as a substitute when the patient cannot undergo an MRI or it is unavailable. X-rays and CT are more commonly used to view the bony structures. They are less frequently used for spinal cord tumors, however, since they cannot reliably detect them. Bone scanning may be used as a supplementary imaging modality for tumors involving bony structures of the spine.

== Treatment ==
Treatment greatly varies depending on the type of spinal cord tumors, goals of care, and prognosis. The primary forms of treatment include surgical resection, radiotherapy, and chemotherapy. Steroids (e.g. corticosteroids) may be administered if there is evidence of spinal cord compression. These do not affect the tumor mass itself, but tend to reduce the inflammatory reaction around it and decrease the overall volume of the mass impinging on the spinal cord.

=== Surgery ===
Surgery has several indications depending on the type of tumor, which includes complete resection, decompression of the nerves, and stabilization. An attempt at total gross resection for a possible cure is an option for patients with primary spinal cord tumors. Extramedullary tumours are more amenable to resection than intramedullary tumours, and even possible to be operated through microendoscopic or pure endoscopic approaches. Surgical treatment of intramedullary tumors is primarily limited by the risk of neurological deficit, however with modern microsurgical techniques and the use of intraoperative neuromonitoring, gross total resection of intrmedullary tumors is sometimes possible. In patients with metastatic tumors, treatment is palliative with the goal of improving the patient's quality of life. In these cases, indications for surgery include pain, stabilization, and spinal cord decompression.

=== Non-surgical treatment ===
Observation, chemotherapy, and radiotherapy are possible options as an adjunct to surgery or for tumors not amenable to surgery. Intradural-extramedullary tumors are often benign, so observation with follow-up imaging is an option in cases where the lesions are small and the patient is asymptomatic. Radiotherapy and chemotherapy may be administered alone or in conjunction with surgery. The choice of chemotherapy or radiotherapy is a multidisciplinary process and depends on the histological grade, type of tumor, and amount of surgical resection achieved. In cases where radiotherapy is chosen, radiation is usually delivered to the involved segment in the spinal cord and the uninvolved segment above and below the involved segment.

The combination of minimally invasive surgery and radiation or chemotherapy is a new technique for treating spinal tumors. This treatment can be tailored to the particular tumor of the spine, either metastatic or primary. Some suggest that direct decompressive surgery combined with postoperative radiotherapy, provide better outcomes than treatment with radiotherapy alone for patients with spinal cord compression due to metastatic cancer.
