= Facet cyst =

Facet cyst or Postoperative synovial facet cysts is the cyst of Lumbar intraspinal synovial joint, that is either a true synovial cyst and ganglion cyst. The cause of facet cysts is not well known.
