= Laminoplasty =

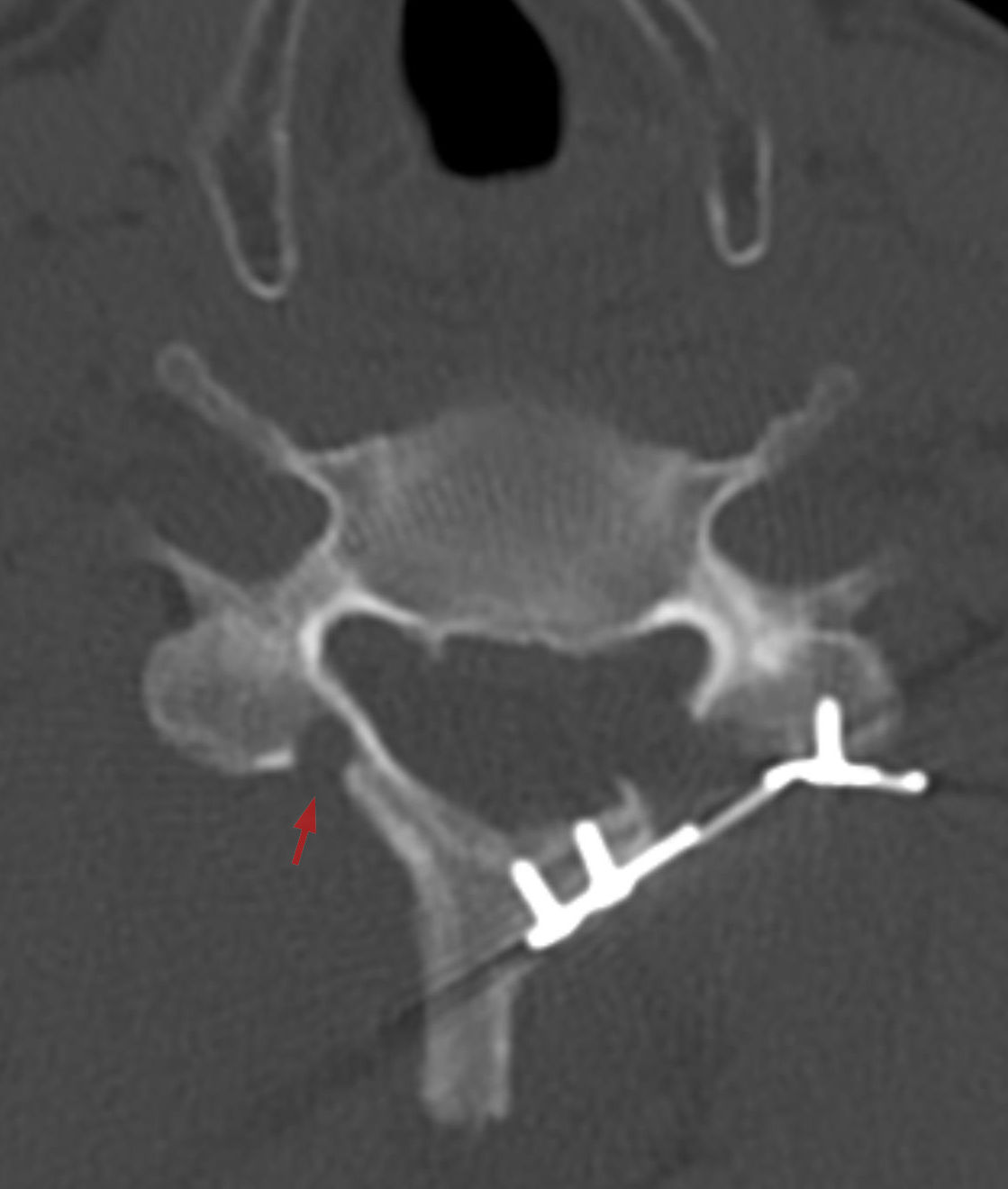
- CT scan of Laminoplasty of cervical vertebra
- ICD-9-CM: 03.09

Laminoplasty is an orthopaedic/neurosurgical surgical procedure for treating spinal stenosis by relieving pressure on the spinal cord. The main purpose of this procedure is to provide relief to patients who may have symptoms of numbness, pain, or weakness in arm movement. The procedure involves cutting the lamina on both sides of the affected vertebrae (cutting through on one side and merely cutting a groove on the other) and then "swinging" the freed flap of bone open thus relieving the pressure on the spinal cord. The spinous process may be removed to allow the lamina bone flap to be swung open. The bone flap is then propped open using small wedges or pieces of bone such that the enlarged spinal canal will remain in place.

This technique contrasts with vertebral laminectomy in the amount of bone and muscle tissue that has to be removed, displaced, or dissected in the procedure.

== History ==
Laminoplasty is a surgical procedure that has been developed as an alternative to cervical laminectomy, which is used to treat cervical myelopathy. Laminoplasty reconstructs the vertebral lamina to decompress the spinal cord. The term laminoplasty means, "to create a hinge to lift the lamina."

To treat myelopathy and ossified posterior longitudinal ligament (OPLL), there are two approaches that can expand the spinal canal. These approaches are the anterior approach which is a direct removal of the cord compressing lesion, or a posterior approach which is an indirect decompression of the spinal cord. Laminectomy was one of the main methods for the posterior approach, however, the creation of laminoplasty was able to avoid several problems associated with the laminectomy procedure. Some risks of the laminectomy procedure include postoperative segmental instability, kyphosis, perineural adhesions, and late neurological deterioration.

The laminoplasty procedure was created by Japanese orthopedic surgeons during the 1970s to 1980s. Over the years, laminoplasty has evolved its technique. The first laminoplasty technique developed was from modifying the Miyazaki and Kirita's technique for laminectomy. This method was described by Oyama as Z-shaped laminoplasty. The name was given due to the z-shape formed when cutting the laminae. The next method is called, en bloc laminoplasty, and it was a modification of the en bloc laminectomy, which was developed by Tsuji. En bloc laminoplasty decompresses the spine by making the laminae act as a flap, and this flap hovered over the cord without sutures or bone grafts. Later in 1977, Hirabayashi and his colleagues introduced the open-door laminoplasty, which was inspired by the en bloc laminoplasty. This method uses sutures on the facet capsule to leave the flap open. After this method, Kurokawa and his team developed the double door laminoplasty. This procedure involves cutting the laminae midline, and hinges are made bilaterally.

Not only are there many other methods of laminoplasty being created, these new methods falling under the open door or double door laminoplasty category, but also, other techniques are being developed in order to preserve the cervical muscle attachment on the spinous processes.

== Anatomy of the spine ==
Spinal column curvature-en

The spine is one of the main components of the central nervous system (CNS). This structure's function is to provide the body with support and to protect the spinal cord. The spinal cord serves 3 main functions for the body. It provides sensation, autonomic and motor control for all bodily functions and parts. The spinal cord is the most complex yet organized part of the CNS. The entire spinal structure may be divided into 4 sections that create an overall S-shaped curve. These sections include the cervical, thoracic, lumbar, and sacral regions. Intervertebral discs stacked on top of one another make up the structure of the overall spine. These discs are separate and cushioned in between them, and with age, these discs become brittle and flat. Sensory stimulation is recognized and processed through the spinal cord, these include pain and temperature, touch, and proprioception. Our body's entire neural network sends any of this sensory information to the spinal cord to process. In order to stabilize spinal movement, there are many ligaments throughout the spine to hold the vertebrae and intervertebral discs together. These elements all working together allow for spinal movement and overall bodily stability and support.

== Laminoplasty purpose ==
The main purpose of this procedure is to provide relief to patients who may develop symptoms of numbness, pain, or weakness in arm movement. Patients may also experience difficulty with hand and finger movement, along with balance and walking difficulty. This surgical procedure is also commonly performed in order to remove pressure from the spinal cord in the neck, which may be due to various reasons. These include: tumors, fractures, arthritis, bone spurs, disc herniations, or degenerative problems.

== Method ==
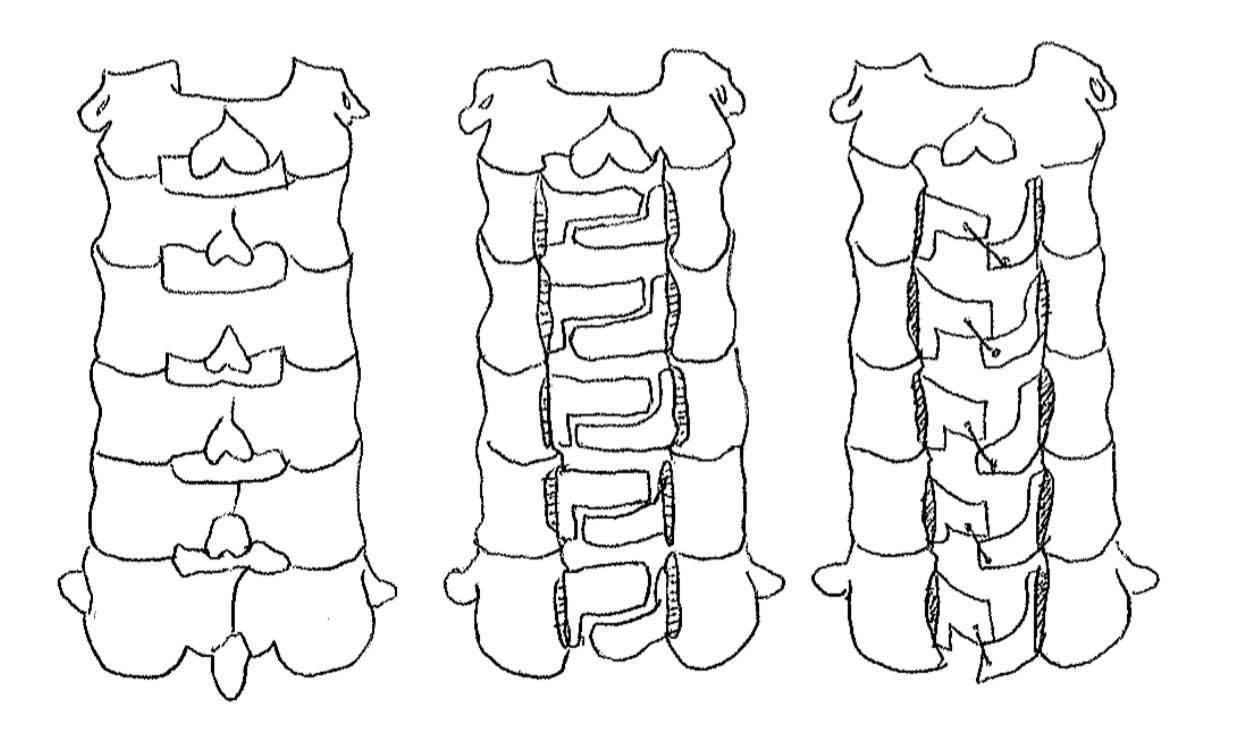
Z-Shaped Laminoplasty - Adapted From R. Kurokawa et al.

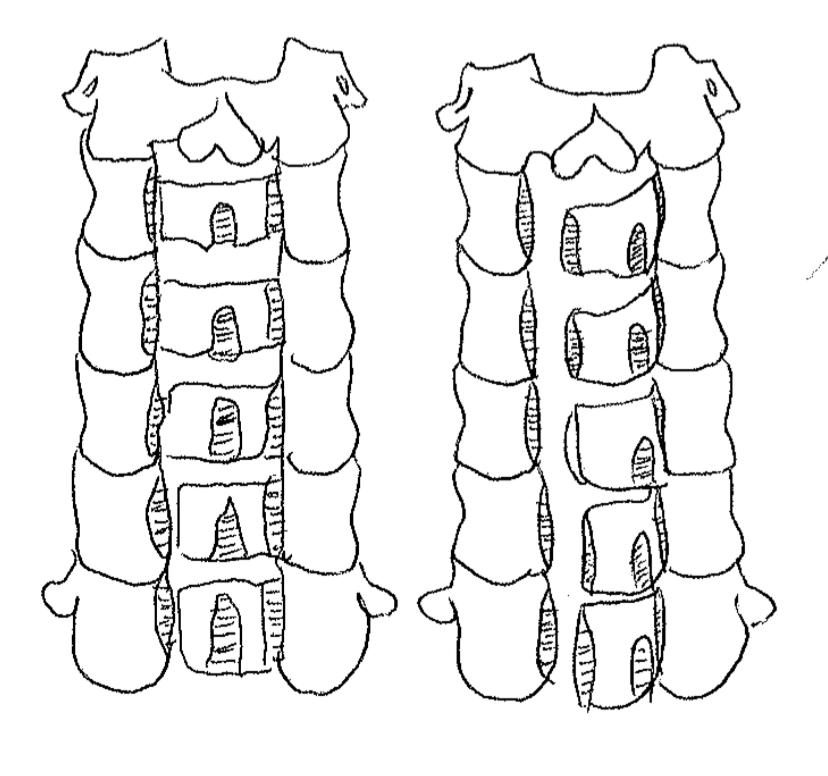
Open Door Laminoplasty - Adapted From R. Kurokawa et al.

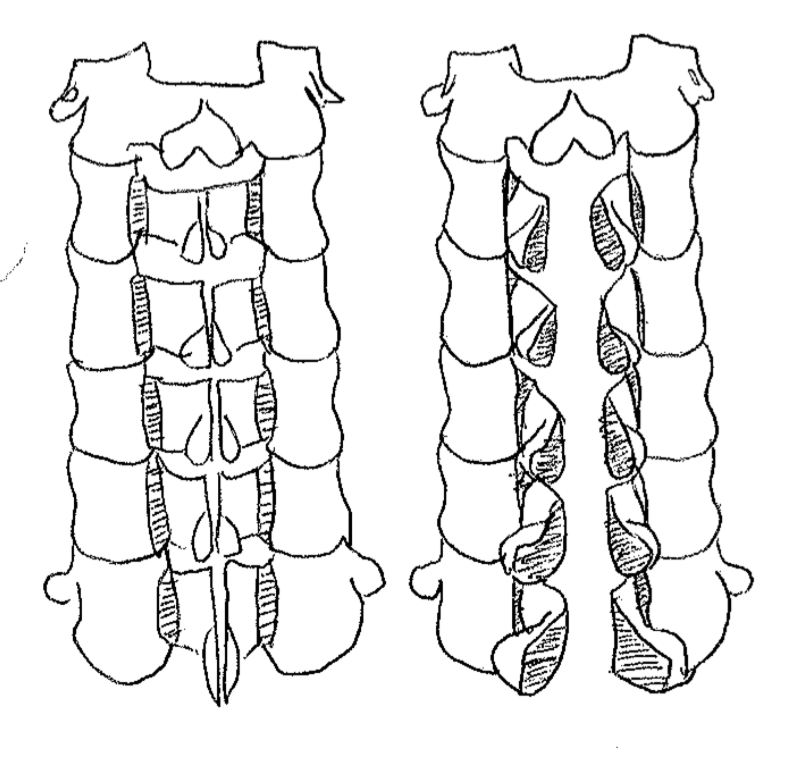
Double Door Laminoplasty - Adapted From R. Kurokawa et al.

=== Positioning ===
In the positioning of the patient, neuromonitoring is performed. The two forms of neuromonitoring implemented are somatosensory evoked potentials (SSEP) and transcranial motor evoked potentials (tcMEP). After monitoring the patient for some time, anesthetic induction and positioning are done. An intubation tube is added to ensure an oral pathway. Individuals with severe myelopathy will need a fiberoptic intubation scope to prevent the risk of extension of the cervical spine during the intubation process. The patient is then placed on a Jackson table with a Mayfield tong. The chest, iliac crests, arms, and knees all have gel padding and mats placed for support. The patient's head is flexed while the neutral alignment of the cervical spine is established. The final step is checking the SSEP and tcMEP signals.

Exposure couple centimeters just inferior to the C7 vertebra. To maintain hemostasis, a monopolar electrocautery is used during the incision process. The incision is usually performed in the region of C3 to C7. The paraspinal muscles are then pushed off the laminae to the medial edge. A lateral radiograph is done with a radiopaque marker, which is placed on the dorsal osseous region. This allows the regions of interest to be determined.

=== Decompression ===
There are several types of laminoplasty techniques for the decompression of the spinal cord. Depending on the laminoplasty technique, the surgeon may repair the vertebral lamina plane with rigid or semi-rigid fixations. Autograft and allograft bone blocks also may be used, but are dependent on the technique. The four most common techniques are Z-shaped, en bloc, open door, and double door laminoplasty.

==== Z-shaped laminoplasty ====
The C2 to C7 laminae are thinned out with a drill. It is important to decompress more than one region of the laminae. A z-shape is cut on the laminae, and the laminae are lifted and connected with a suture.

==== Open door laminoplasty ====
The C2 to C7 laminae are drilled at the lateral borders of the laminae. One side of the bone is completely cut, while the other side acts as a hinge. The laminae are then lifted to increase space in the spinal canal. The flap of the laminae is kept open with a suture that is fixed to the facet capsule.

==== Double door laminoplasty ====
At the midline of the vertebral laminae, a drill is used to cut the bone. The lateral sides of the laminae serve as a hinge that allows expansion of the spinal canal. Specifically, the inner cortex of the lateral portion was part of the hinge. An artificial spacer is used to keep the opening fixed. One common spacer that is used is hydroxyapatite.

== Complications and success rates ==
Complications of this surgical procedure can include nerve damage to either the nerve roots or the spinal cord, which would result in limb weakness or paralysis respectively. Other complications can include infection, spinal fluid leak, or unsuccessful relief of compression. Upon review of over 60 studies, there has been evidence showing that these complications are greater in patients of older age, while it is less common that factors such as body mass index, smoking status, the duration of symptoms as well as baseline severity score contribute to perioperative complications. These studies have also indicated that neck pain is more prevalent in patients undergoing laminoplasty compared to that of other surgical techniques, whereas C-5 palsy occurs less in laminoplasty. There is also a slower progression rate of OPLL in laminoplasty compared to laminectomy. Laminoplasty has a progression rate of only 45.4%, while 52.5% is associated with laminectomy. Other miscellaneous complications that were reported include hematoma, progressive kyphosis, and incomplete decompression. The probability of these complications range from 5-20% after this procedure.

While the success rate of the laminoplasty procedure is dependent on the underlying condition that causes the need of surgery, the vast majority of patients that undergo this procedure see significant relief of pain and approximately 75% of patients see improvement.

== Rehabilitation ==
It is encouraged and sometimes required that patients partake in rehabilitative therapy after undergoing a laminoplasty in order to regain the strength and flexibility of the operated area. While factors such as the age of patients as well as the duration of symptoms prior to surgery influence recovery time, a study assessing the recovery process in patients showed evidence that the preoperative values of all parameters significantly improved 5 years after the surgery.
