= Radicular pain =

Radiculitis
- Specialty: Neurology

Radicular pain, or radiculitis (from the Latin: radicula, lit. 'small root'), is pain "radiated" along the sensory distribution of a nerve due to inflammation or other irritation of the nerve root (radiculopathy) at its connection to the spinal column. A common form of radiculitis is sciatica – radicular pain that radiates along the sciatic nerve from the lower spine to the lower back, gluteal muscles, back of the upper thigh, calf, and foot as often secondary to nerve root irritation from a spinal disc herniation or from osteophytes in the lumbar region of the spine. Radiculitis indicates inflammation of the spinal nerve root, which may lead to pain in that nerve's distribution without weakness – as opposed to radiculopathy. When the radiating pain is associated with numbness or weakness, the diagnosis is radiculopathy if the lesion is at the nerve root, or myelopathy if at the spinal cord itself.

== See also ==
- Intervertebral disc
- Spinal disc herniation
- Arachnoiditis
