= Nerve root =

Initial segment of a nerve leaving the central nervous system

A nerve root (Latin: radix nervi) is the initial segment of a nerve leaving the central nervous system. Nerve roots can be classified as:

- Cranial nerve roots: the initial or proximal segment of one of the twelve pairs of cranial nerves leaving the central nervous system from the brain stem or the highest levels of the spinal cord.
- Spinal nerve roots: the initial or proximal segment of one of the 31 pairs of spinal nerves leaving the central nervous system from the spinal cord. Each spinal nerve is a mixed nerve formed by the union of a sensory dorsal root and a motor ventral root, meaning that there are 62 dorsal/ventral root pairs, and therefore 124 nerve roots in total, each of which stems from a bundle of nerve rootlets (or root filaments).

== Cranial nerve roots ==
Cranial nerves originate directly from the brain's surface: two from the cerebrum and the ten others from the brain stem. Cranial roots differ from spinal roots: some of these roots do not separate into individual sensory (dorsal) and motor (ventral) roots, but can emerge from one fusion root instead; of the twelve cranial nerves, four express this concept of fusion. The remaining eight nerve roots only express one of the two types of connections. Five of these are exclusive motor roots, and the remaining three are all sensory.

== Spinal nerve roots ==
Spinal nerve roots are much more uniform than cranial nerves, one emerging from each level of the spinal column. These roots look extremely similar to one another, and form separate sensory and motor root connections to the central nervous system. Sensory nerves all enter the column as dorsal nerve roots, while motor nerves enter as ventral roots. They are expressed uniformly on both sides of each vertebra along the spinal column.

The specific vertebrae classify spinal nerve roots they originate from. These are separated into four sections: cervical, thoracic, lumbar, and sacral. The cervical is separated into eight vertebrae named C1-C8. The thoracic segment consists of T1-T12; the lumbar is L1-L5; and sacral S1-S5.

== Pain and pathologies ==
Damage to nerve roots can cause paresis and paralysis of the muscle innervated by the affected spinal nerve. It may also cause pain and numbness in the corresponding dermatome. A common cause of damage to the nerve roots is spine lesions, such as prolapse of the nucleus pulposus, spinal tuberculosis, cancer, inflammation, spinal tabs. Root pain syndromes, known colloquially as radiculitis and sciatica, are among the most common symptoms caused by damage to the nerve root. Radiculopathy is commonly called the "root". In addition to pain, nerve damage may lead to impaired muscle control. Typically, mechanical dysfunction is caused by pressure on the nerve root or shock, affecting both the lower limbs and arms' roots.

The first sign of disease (sometimes preceding the occurrence of the radicular syndrome by up to a few years) is a sensation of pain in the neck and shoulder area. This pain often manifests due to hypothermia, poor posture or ergonomics during work or sleep, or sudden head movement. Team roots are localized mostly within the three lower cervical roots, namely C5, C6, and C7.

=== Symptoms ===
- Forced reflexive position of the spine
- Paraspinal muscle contracture
- Reduction of cervical lordosis
- Numerous painful points on the edges of the blade
- Pain at the back of the head slope
- Pain radiating to the upper chest and shoulder area
- The positive sign of nerve root tension in the upper limbs
- Weakness, especially with certain activities

=== C5 radiculopathy ===
- Sensation of pain along the lateral brachium of the affected side of the arm
- C5 innervated muscle weakness may be found (e.g., rhomboids and deltoids)

=== C6 radiculopathy ===
- Sensation of pain along the lateral antebrachium of the affected arm
- C6 innervated muscles are weak (e.g., forearm pronator and supinator and wrist extensors)

=== C7 radiculopathy ===
- Sensation of pain along with the middle finger of the affected arm
- C7 innervated muscles are weak (e.g., wrist flexors and finger extensors)

=== Treatment ===
Treatment should be initiated as early as possible, before any muscle tone increases, which further intensifies the pain. Traction is recommended to decompress compressed roots. Radiculopathy can be caused by herniated nucleus pulposus. Surgery is the last resort when conservative therapy is unsuccessful.

== Lower limb radiculopathies ==
The cause is a herniated intervertebral disc, often on a single nerve root. The first sign of the nerve root sickness is usually lumbago, which usually occurs with periods of remission. The time to develop a full radicular syndrome may take several months or several years. Pain generally increases gradually, but it can also be sudden. Cold causes muscle contraction, which leads to increased previously hidden symptoms.

=== Symptoms ===
- Scoliosis
- Paraspinal muscle contracture
- The reduction of lumbar lordosis
- Tingling or numbness
- Increased sensitivity
- Other inflammatory diseases

=== L4 radiculopathy ===
- Pain located on the front of the thigh and shin further radiates towards the inner ankle, sometimes the medial toe
- Occasionally, failure of the quadriceps muscle and reflex weakness

=== L5 radiculopathy ===
- Pain radiates to the side of the thigh and lower leg towards the back of the foot and toes 1–3
- All reflexes are preserved

=== S1 radiculopathy ===
- Pain radiates to the posterior side of the thigh and lower leg to the ankle side, sometimes up to the fourth toe
- Gluteal muscles are weakened
- Difficulty standing on toes

=== Treatment ===
Treatment can vary based on the nature and severity of the disease. A compressed nerve root can cause radicular pain with or without radiculopathy. Most of the time, symptoms from a compressed nerve will start to feel better within 6 to 12 weeks of nonsurgical treatment.

To unlock the nerve root in the acute phase, it is recommended to apply traction and isometric muscle relaxation, and should be the first procedure to be performed in cases of severe pain. In cases where manipulation is undesirable or impossible to carry out, the infiltration may be root. Anti-inflammatory medications may be used to alleviate symptoms. In the acute setting, the main goal is to restore proper mobility by reducing pain. Surgery is used when other methods do not produce results, except when paralysis is observed; in those cases, surgery should be performed as soon as possible to avoid irreversible paralysis of muscles.
