= Spondylolysis =

Defect or stress fracture in the spine

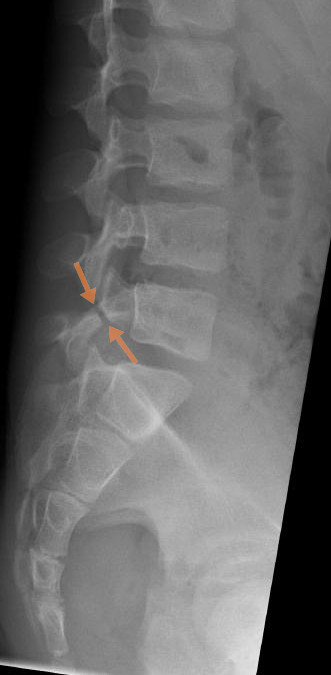
- Arrows show break in pars interarticularis at L5. X-Ray of lumbar spine, lateral projection, in an 11-year-old boy
- Specialty: Orthopedics
- Diagnostic method: X-ray, CT scan, MRI

Spondylolysis also known as a pars defect or pars fracture, is a defect or stress fracture in the pars interarticularis of the vertebral arch. The vast majority of cases occur in the lower lumbar vertebrae (L5), but spondylolysis may also occur in the cervical vertebrae.

== Signs and symptoms ==
In majority of cases, spondylolysis presents asymptomatically, which can make diagnosis both difficult and incidental. When a patient does present with symptoms, there are general signs and symptoms a clinician will look for:

- Clinical signs:
  - Pain on completion of the stork test (placed in hyperextension and rotation)
  - Excessive lordotic posture
  - Unilateral tenderness on palpation
  - Visible on diagnostic imaging (Scottie dog fracture)
- Symptoms:
  - Unilateral low back pain
  - Pain that radiates into the buttocks or legs
  - Onset of pain can be acute or gradual
  - Pain that can restrict daily activities
  - Pain that worsens after strenuous activity
  - Pain aggravated with lumbar hyperextension
  - Difficulty in movement in spinal cord

== Cause ==
The cause of spondylolysis sometimes remains unknown, however many factors are thought to contribute to its development. The condition is present in up to 6% of the population, the majority of which usually present asymptomatically. Research supports that there are hereditary and acquired risk factors that can make one more susceptible to the defect. The disorder is generally more prevalent in males than in females and tends to occur earlier in males due to their involvement in more strenuous activities at a younger age. In a young athlete, the spine is still growing; there are many ossification centers, leaving points of weakness in the spine. This leaves young athletes at increased risk, particularly when involved in repetitive hyperextension and rotation across the lumbar spine. Spondylolysis is a common cause of low back pain in preadolescents and adolescent athletes, as it accounts for about 50% of all low back pain. It is believed that both repetitive trauma and an inherent genetic weakness can make an individual more susceptible to spondylolysis.

=== Risk factors ===
Sports involving repetitive or forceful hyperextension of the spine, especially when combined with rotation are the main mechanism of injury for spondylolysis. The stress fracture of the pars interarticularis occurs on the side opposite to activity. For instance, for a right-handed player, the fracture occurs on the left side of the vertebrae.

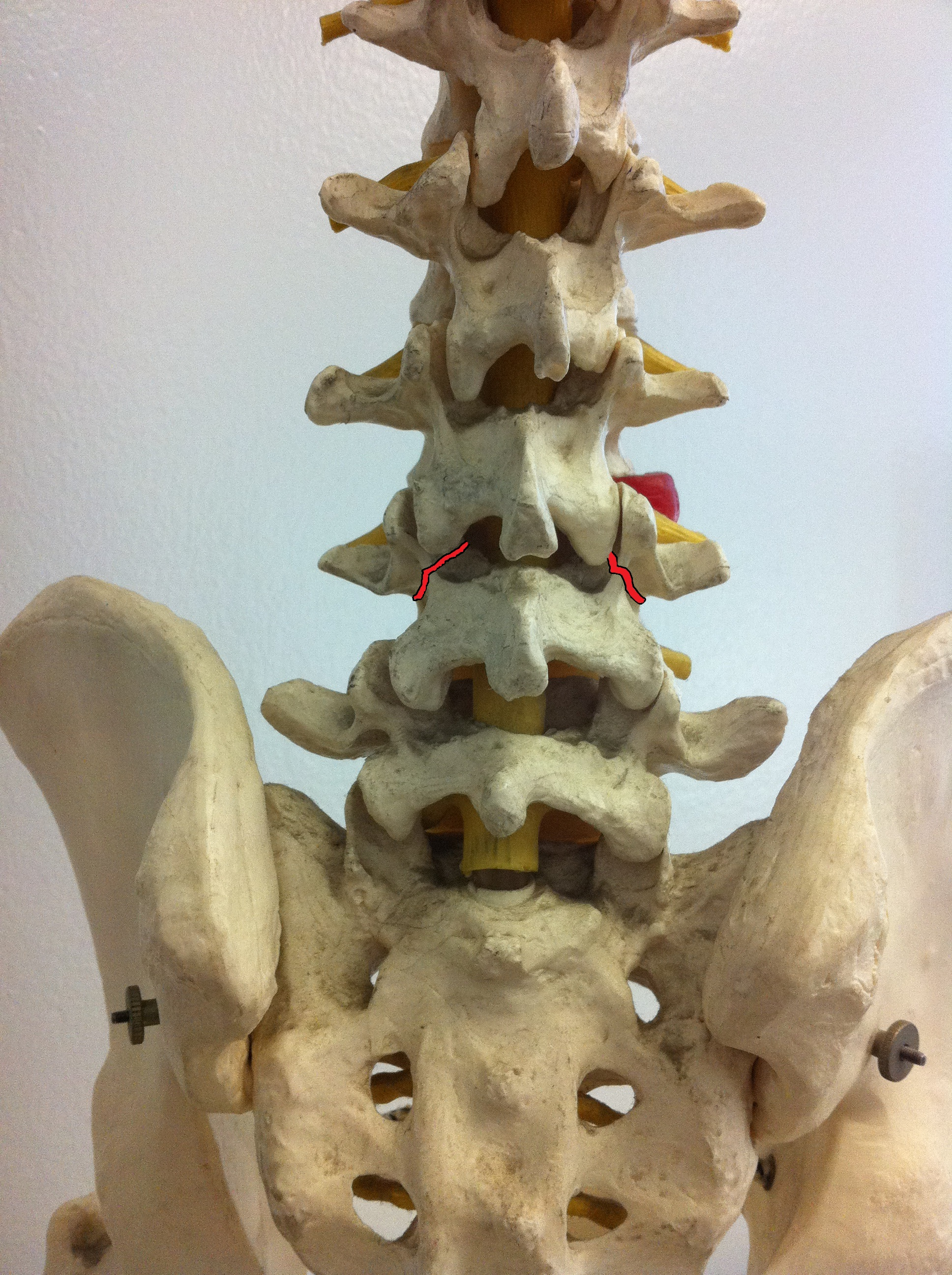
Pars interarticularis marked with red lines

Spondylolysis has a higher occurrence in the following activities:

- Baseball
- Military service
- Tennis
- Diving
- Ballet
- Cheerleading
- Gymnastics
- Gridiron Football
- Association Football
- Wrestling
- Weightlifting
- Roller Derby
- Cricket
- Pole Vault
- Rugby
- Volleyball
- Gym
- Ultimate Frisbee (especially during impact from laying out)
- Muay Thai
- Hockey (due to the bending of the waist)

Although this condition can be caused by repetitive trauma to the lumbar spine in strenuous sports, other risk factors can also predispose individuals to spondylolysis. Males are more commonly affected by spondylolysis than females. In one study looking at youth athletes, it was found that the mean age of individuals with spondylolysis was 20 years of age. Spondylolysis also runs in families suggesting a hereditary component such as a predisposition to weaker vertebrae.

== Pathophysiology ==
Spondylolysis is a bony defect or fracture within the pars interarticularis of the vertebral arch in the spinal column. The vast majority of spondylolysis occur in the lumbar vertebrae, however it can also be seen in cervical vertebrae. The lumbar vertebra consist of a body, pedicle, lamina, pars interarticularis, transverse process, spinous process and superior and inferior articular facets, which form joints that link the vertebrae together. When examining the vertebra, the pars interarticularis is the bony segment between the superior and inferior articular facet joints located anterior to the lamina and posterior to the pedicle. Separation of the pars interarticularis occurs when spondylolysis is present in the spinal column.

Spondylolysis is typically caused by a stress fracture of the bone, and is especially common in adolescents who over-train in activities. The pars interarticularis is vulnerable to fracture during spinal hyperextension, especially when combined with rotation, or when experiencing a force during a landing. This stress fracture most commonly occurs where the concave lumbar spine transitions to the convex sacrum (L5-S1). A significant number of individuals with spondylolysis will develop spondylolisthesis, which is true for 50-81% of this population.

== Diagnosis ==
There are several imaging techniques used to diagnose spondylolysis. Common imaging techniques include X-ray, MRI, Bone Scintigraphy (Bone Scan), and Computed Tomography (CT Scan).

The scottie dog sign was once used as a diagnostic sign in x-rays, for lumbar spondylolysis, but it is no longer commonly in use due to the advent of more sensitive diagnostic methods such as the CT scan and MRI scan. If spondylolysis is present, the pars interarticularis, or the neck of the dog, gives the appearance of a Scottish Terrier with a collar around its neck.

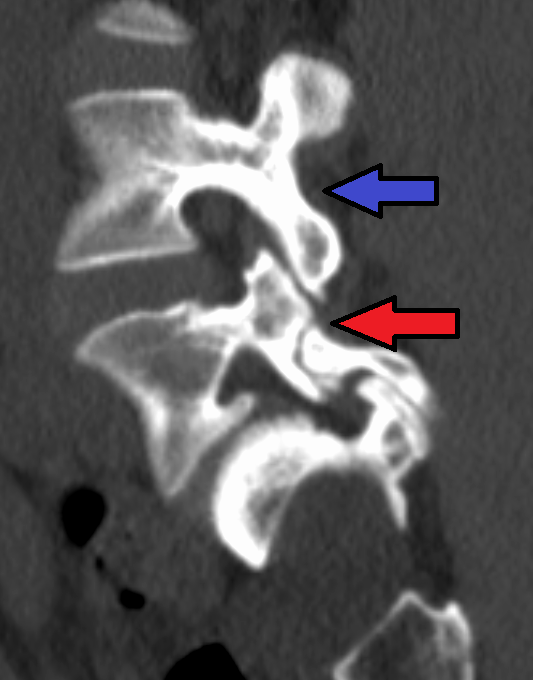
Red arrow break in pars interarticularis. Blue arrow normal pars interarticularis. Spondylolisthesis at L5.

=== X-Ray ===
X-rays (electromagnetic radiation) are projected through the body to produce an image of its internal structures. The radiation is more attenuated (absorbed) by the denser tissues of the body (i.e. bone) than the softer tissues (i.e. muscles, organs, etc.) creating a picture composed of shades of grey ranging from white to black. A vertebra with a fracture or defect of the pars interarticularis will have a dark mark through this region of bone. Since this is difficult to see on the AP (anterior posterior) x-ray view an oblique x-ray of the lumbar spine can usually identify the spondylolysis. If inconclusive a further CT scan can produce a 3-dimensional images to more clearly show the defect although the exam increases the patients radiation dose by at least an order of magnitude than plain x-rays.

=== Bone scintigraphy ===
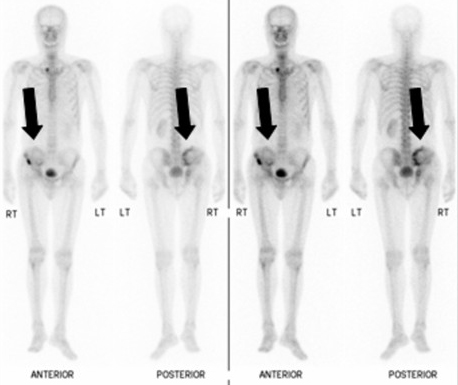
Bone scintigraphy showing black marks where pelvic bone damage has occurred.

Also known as a bone scan, bone scintigraphy involves the injection of a small amount of radioactive tracer into the bloodstream. This tracer decays and emits radioactive energy which can be detected by a special camera. The camera produces a black and white image where areas shown as dark black indicate bone damage of some kind. If there is a black spot in the lumbar vertebrae (e.g. L5) this indicates damage and potentially spondylolysis. If this test is positive, a CT scan is usually ordered to confirm spondylolysis.

=== Computed tomography ===
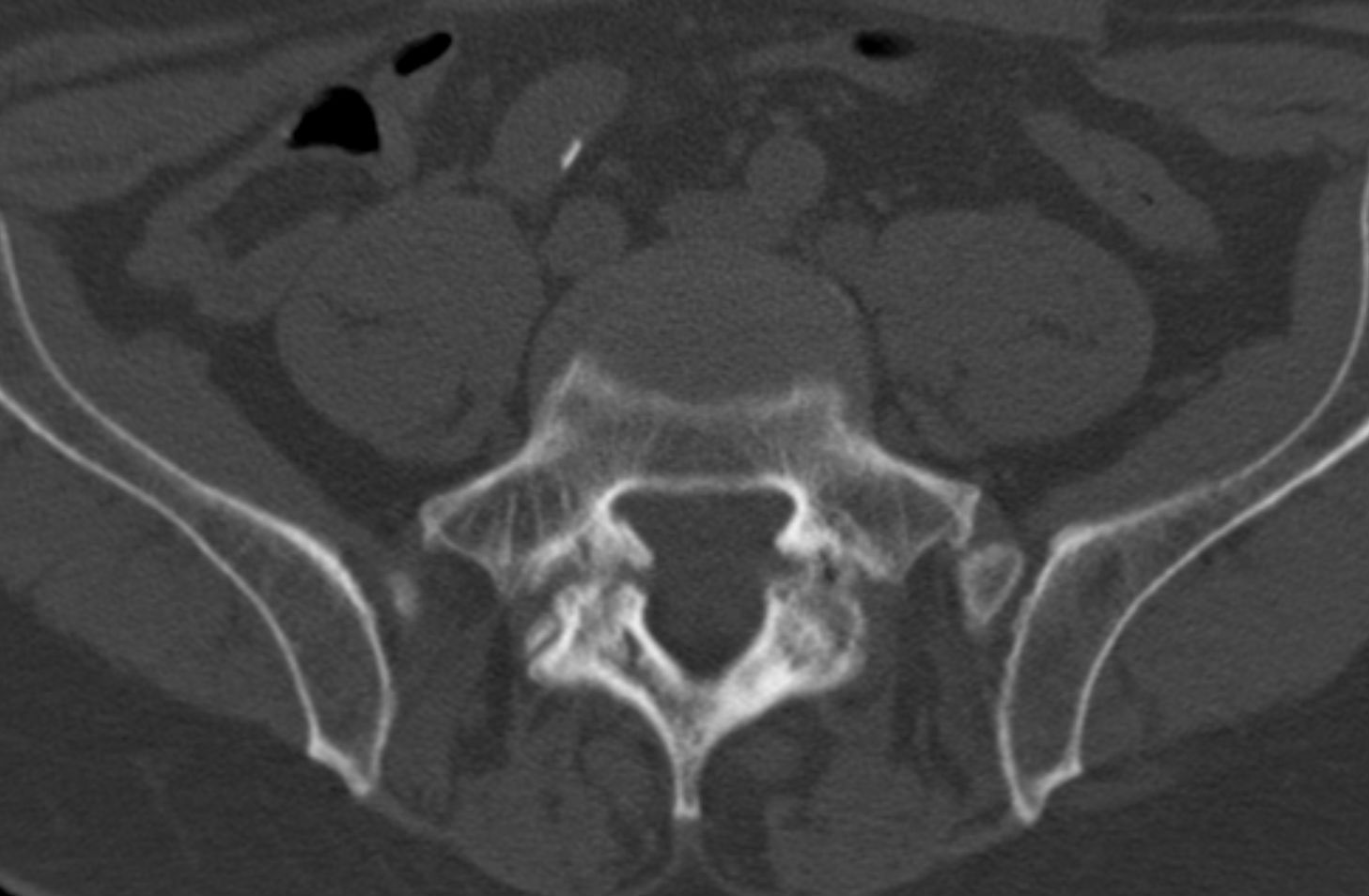
Cross-sectional image of a vertebra showing spondylolysis.

Commonly known as a CT Scan or CAT scan, this form of imaging uses x-rays to produce multiple cross-sectional images, or "slices", through a part of the body. This allows a physician to evaluate the body in greater detail than an x-ray allows. For this reason the CT scan is much more accurate in detecting spondylolysis than an x-ray. Bone scintigraphy combined with CT scan is considered the reference standard, which means that it is best at detecting spondylolysis.

=== MRI ===
MRI is a newer technique used to diagnose spondylolysis and is favorable for a few reasons. MRI is more accurate than x-ray and does not use radiation. Instead, MRI uses powerful magnets and radio frequency pulses to produce cross-sectional images.

== Treatment ==
Treatment for spondylolysis ranges from bracing, activity restriction, extension exercises, flexion exercises and deep abdominal strengthening, that is administered through physical therapy. The duration of physical therapy a patient receives varies upon the severity of spondylolysis, however typically ranges from three to six months. The goal of physical therapy is to minimize movement at the unstable defect of the pars interarticularis. Once a patient completes physical therapy, and displays no symptoms or inflammation in the lower back, they are cleared to continue with daily or athletic activities. However, a patient may need to maintain a variety of rehabilitation techniques after physical therapy to prevent the recurrence of spondylolysis.

=== Exercise ===
The aim of deep abdominal co-contraction exercises is to train muscles surrounding the lumbar spine which provide stability of the spine. Spondylolysis results in a spinal instability and disrupts patterns of co-recruitment between muscle synergies. Specifically, local muscles that attach directly to the spine are affected. The lumbar multifidus and transversus abdominis play a direct role in stabilizing the lumbar spine. Instead the local muscles in individuals with spondylolysis are vulnerable to dysfunction, which results in abnormal spinal stability causing chronic low back pain. To compensate, the large torque producing global muscles are used to stabilize the spine.

In one study, patients are taught to train the co-contraction of deep abdominal muscles and lumbar multifidus in static postures, functional tasks and aerobic activities. This technique was shown to reduce pain and functional disability when compared to other conservative treatments. These results also had a long-term effect in reducing levels of pain and functional disability. This is because motor programming eventually became automatic, and conscious control was no longer needed to contract the deep abdominal muscles during activities.

=== Activity restriction ===
Activity restriction of spondylolysis is advised for a short period of time once the patient becomes symptomatic, followed by a guided physical therapy program. Once spondylolysis has been diagnosed, treatment often consists of a short rest period of two to three days, followed by a physical therapy program. There should be restriction of heavy lifting, excessive bending, twisting and avoidance of any work, recreational activities or participation in sport that causes stress to the lumbar spine. Activity restriction can help eliminate and control a patient's symptoms so they are able to resume their normal activities. Activity restriction is most commonly used in conjunction with other rehabilitation techniques including bracing.

=== Bracing ===
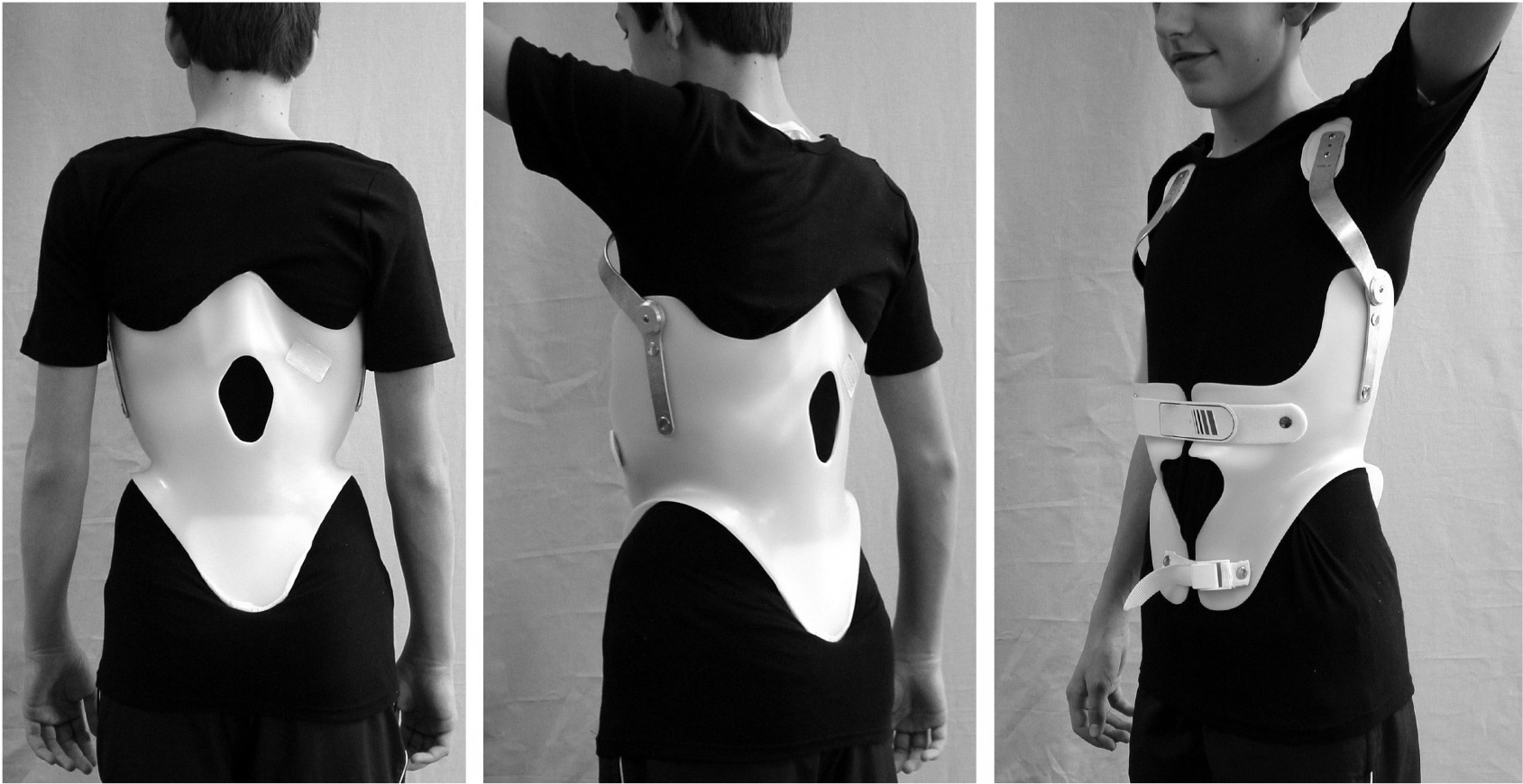
Antilordotic lumbosacral brace (Boston brace)

Acute spondylolysis is most commonly treated through the use of an antilordotic brace (Boston brace) to control and limit spinal movement, and reduce stress on the injured spinal segment. Bracing immobilizes the spine in a flexed position for a short period to allow healing of the bony defect in the pars interarticularis. An antilordotic brace commonly utilizes a plastic component that is contoured to closely fit the body. Antilordotic bracing subsequently reduces the patient's symptoms by decreasing the amount of stress on the lower back, and allows a prompt return to sport for athletes. Typically, bracing is utilized for 6–12 weeks.

In order for a brace to be effective, it must be worn every day for the required amount of time. Patients are given a brace schedule determined by their physical therapist that explains the amount of time the brace must be worn daily. A brace's effectiveness increases with adherence to the bracing schedule. Patients that do not follow their bracing schedule are more likely to have their symptoms progress. Research has demonstrated that when braces are used as prescribed with full compliance, they are successful at preventing spondylolysis progression.

=== Injections ===
Facet joint injections may be administered as a minimally invasive, non-surgical treatment for spondylosis. They reduce pain and inflammation caused by the facet joints connecting the vertebrae in the spine. Lumbar epidural steroid injections, where a steroid or corticosteroid medication is injected into the epidural space by the spinal cord, may also be administered for chronic pain management.

=== Surgery ===
Most patients with spondylolysis do not require surgery but, if the symptoms are not relieved with non-surgical treatments, or when the condition progresses to high grade spondylolisthesis, then patients may require surgery.

- Spinal fusion: This procedure is recommended when a set of vertebrae becomes loose or unstable. The surgeon joins two or more bones (vertebrae) together through the use of metal rods, screws, and bone grafts. The bone grafts complete their fusion in 4–8 months following the surgery, securing the spine in the correct position. The procedure is also used to treat spinal instability, fractures in the lumbar spine and, severe degenerative disc disease. The process is relatively non-invasive, performed through small incisions and has a high success rate.
- Laminectomy: Often performed when spinal stenosis occurs in conjunction with spondylolysis. The procedure surgically removes part or all of the lamina from the bony ring of the vertebra to reduce the pressure on the spinal cord. The laminectomy is commonly performed on the vertebrae in the lower back and in the neck.
- Pars Repair: Pars repair is a surgical procedure that might be considered for younger individuals, usually those under 25 years old, who have a specific type of back injury but no significant damage to the spinal disc. This means there is no rupture and minimal or no slippage (spondylolisthesis). During this surgery, the doctor focuses on the fractured part of the vertebra. They use a metallic device, like a small wire, hook, screw, or rod, to connect the two sides of the broken bone and keep the vertebra stable. This helps the bone stay in place and heal. To further assist the healing process, the surgeon might use a bone graft.

== Implications for rehabilitation ==
Spondylolysis can have a huge impact on a young athlete's career, and may impede their future ability to perform. It is important to understand how social and psychological factors may affect rehabilitation of an injured athlete.

Frustration, anger, confusion, fear and depression are some of the psychological factors that injured athletes experience, therefore a debilitating injury can have a large impact on an athlete's mental well-being. These psychological factors can also affect recovery and return to sport as fear of re-injury often prevents athletes from adhering to rehabilitation and returning to their sport at full intensity.

Social factors can also impact the cognitive, behavioural and physical responses to injury. More specifically, social isolation from the team can have a profound psychological effect. This makes it essential to provide social support through supportive listening, emotional support, personal assistance, and reality conformation.

It is also critical to educate the athletes on the rehabilitation process so they know what to expect. For instance, explaining what activities to avoid and will cause pain as well as the duration of the treatment process. In addition, it is important to select the correct treatment option for each individual. For conservative methods, adherence to the exercise requires motivated patients as it can be tedious and time-consuming. For instance, one study looking at deep abdominal co-contraction reported that it can take as long a 4–5 weeks to achieve this pattern of co-contraction.

== Notable people with spondylolysis ==
- Matt Smith: Actor who played the eleventh incarnation of the Doctor in the BBC series Doctor Who and Prince Philip in the Netflix series The Crown. He initially aspired to be a professional footballer, but his spondylolysis forced him out of the sport.
