= Recurrent branch =

Recurrent branch may refer to:

- Recurrent branch of the median nerve
- Recurrent branch of the radial
- Recurrent nerves of Luschka
