= Facet joint arthrosis =

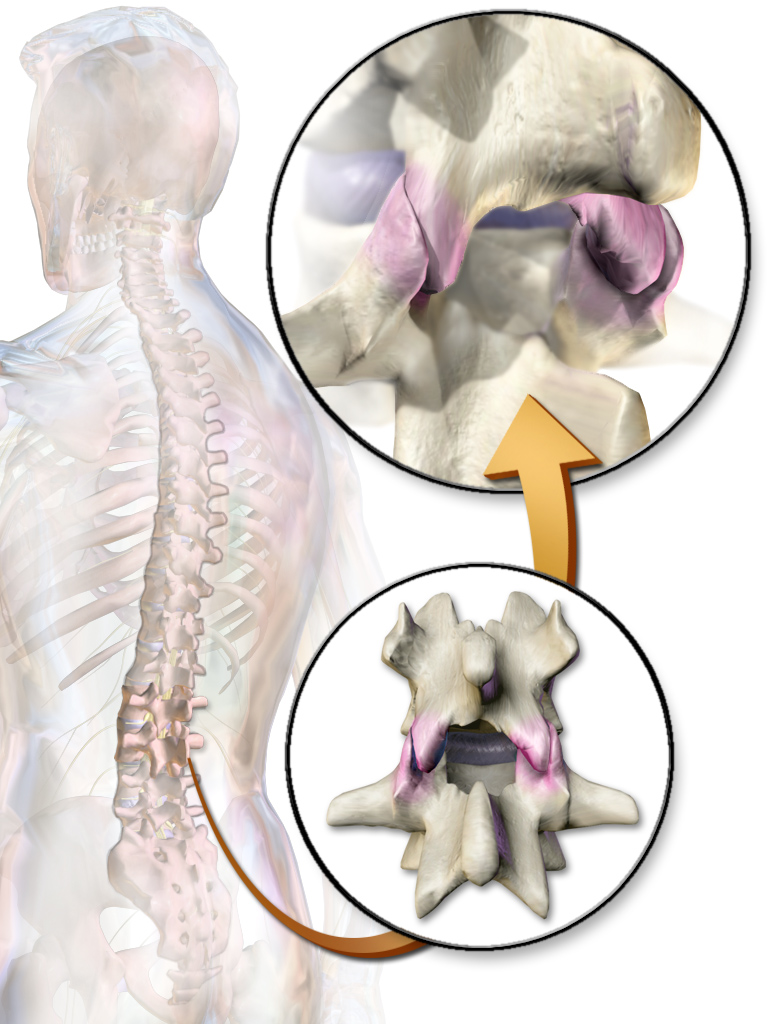
- Facet joints
- Specialty: Orthopedic

Facet joint arthrosis is an intervertebral disc disorder. The facet joints or zygapophyseal joints are synovial cartilage covered joints that limit the movement of the spine and preserve segmental stability. In the event of hypertrophy of the vertebrae painful arthrosis can occur. The "lumbar facet arthrosis syndrome" was described in a 1987 article by S. M. Eisenstein and C. R. Parry of Witwatersrand University.

== Diagnosis ==
Computerized tomography is the ideal for typifying facet joint arthrosis; evidence suggests that magnetic resonance imaging is not as sensitive in identifying bony changes.

== See also ==
- Facet syndrome
