= Nucleolus and neural progenitor protein =

Protein-coding gene in humans

RMP64

Identifiers
- Aliases: RMP64, NET17, C3orf17, nucleolus and neural progenitor protein, ANXD3, ribonuclease MRP subunit p64, NEPRO
- External IDs: OMIM: 617089; MGI: 2384836; GeneCards: RMP64

Gene location (Human)
Chr.	Chromosome 3 (human)
Band	3q13.2	Start	113,002,444 bp
Band	3q13.2	End	113,019,861 bp

Gene location (Mouse)
Chr.	Chromosome 16 (mouse)
Band	16|16 B4	Start	44,544,664 bp
Band	16|16 B4	End	44,557,647 bp
RNA expression pattern
Bgee	Human / Mouse (ortholog); Top expressed in: secondary oocyte; endothelial cell; parietal pleura; tibialis anterior muscle; visceral pleura; germinal epithelium; pancreatic epithelial cell; epithelium of nasopharynx; deltoid muscle; Achilles tendon / Top expressed in: tail of embryo; otic vesicle; primitive streak; genital tubercle; epiblast; Paneth cell; otic placode; spermatocyte; cumulus cell; somite; More reference expression data
BioGPS	n/a
Orthologs
Databases	NCBI: entry; OMA: entry
Species	Human	Mouse
Entrez	25871	212547
Ensembl	ENSG00000163608	ENSMUSG00000036208
UniProt	Q6NW34	Q8R2U2
RefSeq (mRNA)	NM_001025072; NM_001025073; NM_015412; NM_001319109; NM_001319110 NM_001319111; NM_001319112; NM_001319114; NM_001319115	NM_145972
RefSeq (protein)	NP_001306038; NP_001306039; NP_001306040; NP_001306041; NP_001306043 NP_001306044; NP_056227	NP_666084
Location (UCSC)	Chr 3: 113 – 113.02 Mb	Chr 16: 44.54 – 44.56 Mb
PubMed search
- Wikidata
View/Edit Human	View/Edit Mouse

Nucleolus and neural progenitor protein (NEPRO), also called Ribonuclease MRP subunit P64, is a protein that in humans is encoded by the RMP64 gene (previously NEPRO).

NEPRO functions as a Notch effector for the development and maintenance of neural progenitor cells in the neocortex.

Biallelic variants in NEPRO can cause a very rare ribosomopathy known as anauxetic dysplasia type 3, which is characterized by severely impaired skeletal growth, resulting in severe short stature, brachydactyly, skin laxity, joint hypermobility, and joint dislocations.
