= Retrolisthesis =

Posterior displacement (but not dislocation) of a vertebra relative to the one below it

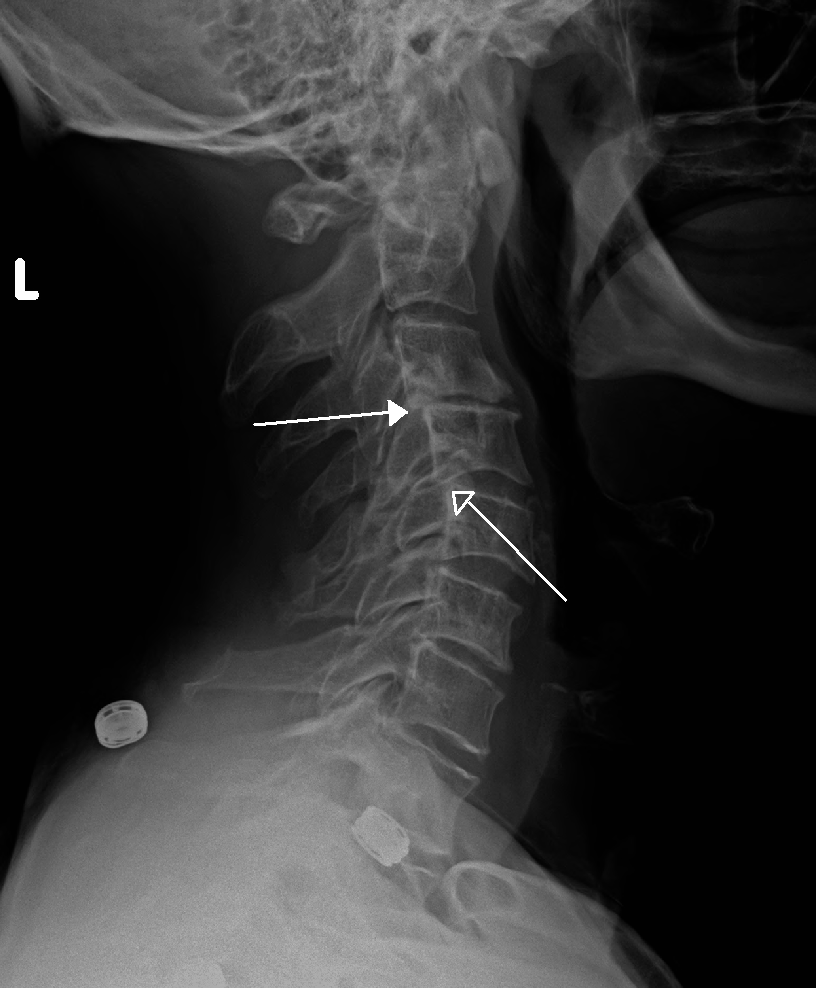
- Grade 1 retrolistheses of C3 on C4 and C4 on C5
- Specialty: Orthopedics

A retrolisthesis is a posterior displacement of one vertebral body with respect to the subjacent vertebra to a degree less than a luxation (dislocation). Retrolistheses are most easily diagnosed on lateral x-ray views of the spine. Views where care has been taken to expose for a true lateral view without any rotation offer the best diagnostic quality.

Retrolistheses are found most prominently in the cervical spine and lumbar region but can also be seen in the thoracic area.

== Classification ==
Retrolisthesis can be classified as a form of spondylolisthesis, since spondylolisthesis is often defined in the literature as displacement in any direction. Yet, medical dictionaries usually define spondylolisthesis specifically as the forward or anterior displacement of a vertebra over the vertebra inferior to it (or the sacrum). Retrolisthesis is also called retrospondylolisthesis.

== Signs and symptoms ==
Retrolisthesis may lead to multiple symptoms of greatly varying intensity and distribution. This is because of the variable nature of the impact on nerve tissue and of the mechanical impact on the spinal joints themselves.

Structural instability may be experienced as a local uneasiness through to a more far reaching structural compensatory distortion involving the whole spine. If the joints are stuck in a retrolisthesis configuration there may also be changes to range of motion.

Pain may be experienced as a result of irritation to the sensory nerve roots by bone depending on the degree of displacement and the presence of any rotatory positioning of the individual spinal motion segments. The soft tissue of the disc is often caused to bulge in retrolistheses. These cannot be determined by plain films, as the x-ray passes through the soft tissue. A study by Giles et al., stated that sixteen of the thirty patients (53%) had retrolisthesis of L5 on S1 ranging from 2–9 mm; these patients had either intervertebral disc bulging or protrusion on CT examination ranging from 3–7 mm into the spinal canal. Fourteen patients (47%) without retrolisthesis (control group) did not show any retrolisthesis and the CT did not show any bulge/protrusion. On categorizing x-ray and CT pathology as being present or not, the well positioned i.e. true lateral plain x-ray film revealed a sensitivity and specificity of 100% ([95% Confidence Interval. = [89%–100%]) for bulge/protrusion in this preliminary study.” (^{7})

Spinal cord compressions are also possible with patients experiencing pain, rigidity and neurologic signs that may follow some distance along nerves to cause symptoms at some distance from the location of the retrolisthesis.

== Diagnosis ==
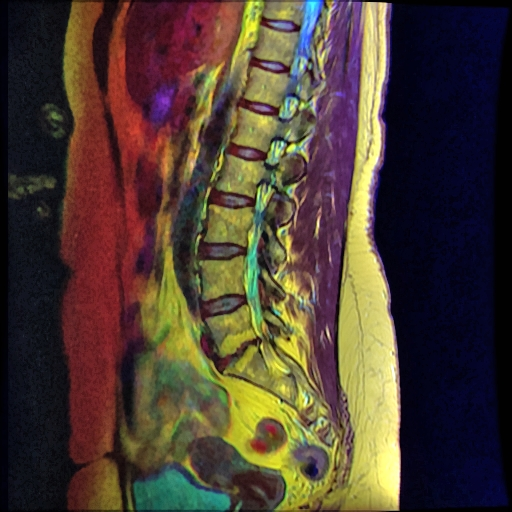
Retrolisthesis of L5-S1

Complete Retrolisthesis - The body of one vertebra is posterior to both the vertebral body of the segment of the spine above as well as below.

Stairstepped Retrolisthesis - The body of one vertebra is posterior to the body of the spinal segment above, but is anterior to the one below.

Partial Retrolisthesis - The body of one vertebra is posterior to the body of the spinal segment either above or below. (^{3})

=== Grading ===
Since the vertebral body in a retrolisthesis moves in a posterior direction, the grading used for spondylolistheses is of little use. It is however useful to divide the anterior to posterior dimension of the intervertebral foramina (IVF) (^{4}) into four equal units. A posterior displacement of up to ¼ of the IVF is graded as Grade 1, ¼ to ½ as Grade 2, ½ to ¾ as Grade 3, ¾ to total occlusion of the IVF as Grade 4. Alternatively, a measurement of the amount of displacement can also made by measuring the bone displacement in millimetres.

Retrolistheses can be caused by injury and the resulting instability of the connecting soft tissues especially ligaments, discs, muscles, tendons and fascia. They may also involve muscles through spasm as a result of nerve malfunction due to pressure caused by the posterior displacement of the vertebra encroaching on the contents of the IVF. The IVF's contents include spinal (sensory and motor) nerves, arteries, veins and lymphatic vessels which cater to the nutritional and waste removal needs of the spinal cord.

Degenerative spinal changes are often seen at the levels where a retrolisthesis is found. These changes are more pronounced as time progresses after injury, and are evidenced by end plate osteophytosis, disc damage, disc narrowing, desiccation and disc bulging. “A retrolisthesis hyperloads at least one disc and puts shearing forces on the anterior longitudinal ligament, the annular rings, nucleus pulposus, cartilage end plates and capsular ligaments. The bulging, twisting and straining tissues attached to the endplates pull, push and stretch it. It is worsened with time, becoming irreversible.” This is the etiology of degenerative joint disease. (^{5})

Associated radiological findings include a vacuum phenomenon (in the nucleus pulposis of the adjacent intervertebral disc), reduction of disc height with corresponding loss of the disc space, marginal sclerosis of the adjacent vertebral bodies, osteophyte formation and apophyseal joint instability. With a retrolisthesis there is always a less than ideal positioning of spinal segments. There is also always a reduced anterior to posterior dimension of the spinal canal compared to the way it is supposed to be. The greater the posterior displacement, the more significant it is for producing a dysfunctional spinal cord or even a cauda equina syndrome.

=== Joint stability ===
Joint stability is easily evaluated by the use of flexion and extension lateral x-ray views of the spine. A summary of part of the DRE tables (^{6}) give a guide as to the implications of the joint instability. If either translation or angular change is determined from flexion to extension to the degree shown in the table below, then Category IV instability is present. See also Joint stability.

Translation is a gliding motion where one bone of a joint glides over its neighbour.
