= Transforaminal ligaments =

Ligaments of the spine

Transforaminal ligaments are inconstant ligaments that extend through an intervertebral foramen. They are thought to protect the adjacent spinal nerve and vessels. The ligaments are not widely known and were once considered anomalous; there are no widely accepted criteria for their identification and classification. They were once postulated to be a cause of spinal nerve entrapment (as they may occupy a significant share of the lumen of a foramen), however, at present, their role in the radicular pain has is unclear.

== Anatomy ==
There are five types of transforaminal ligaments:

- The superior corporotransverse ligament attaches at the posterolateral aspect of the body of the vertebra, and at the accessory process of the transverse process of the same vertebra.
- The inferior corporotransverse ligament attaches at the posterolateral aspect of the body of one vertebra, and at the transverse process of the below vertebra.
- The superior transforaminal ligament attaches along the inferior intervertebral notch (of the pedicle of the upper vertebra of the intervertebral foramen).
- The superior transforaminal ligament attaches along the superior intervertebral notch (of the pedicle of the lower vertebra of the intervertebral foramen).
- The mid-transforaminal ligament attaches at the posterolateral aspect of an annulus fibrosus at one end, and at the ligamentum flavum (posterior to the articular capsule of the zygapophyseal joint).

=== Variation ===
Transforaminal ligaments are not present in all individuals; when present, multiple types are oftener present. The most common type is the superior corporotransverse ligament. The ligaments have variously been reported to be identifiable in 17.8%-100% of individuals; the discrepancy is a result of inconsistent standards for their identification and classification.
