= Posterior branches of the lumbar nerves =

Group of nerves supplying the back

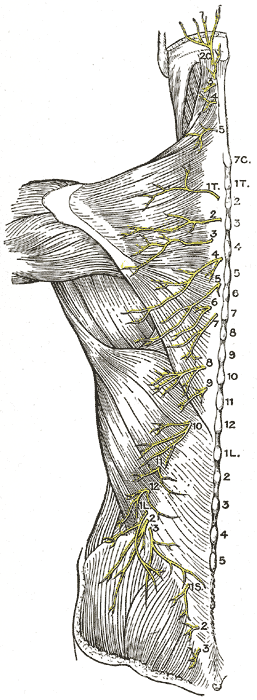
- Diagram of the distribution of the cutaneous branches of the posterior divisions of the spinal nerves.

Details
- From: lumbar nerves
- To: superior cluneal nerves

Identifiers
- Latin: rami posteriores nervorum lumbalium

The posterior branches of the lumbar nerves branch from the dorsal rami of the lumbar nerves.

== Branches ==
- The medial branches run close to the articular processes of the vertebræ and end in the Multifidus.
- The lateral branches supply the Sacrospinalis. The upper three give off cutaneous nerves which pierce the aponeurosis of the Latissimus dorsi at the lateral border of the Sacrospinalis and descend across the posterior part of the iliac crest to the skin of the buttock, some of their twigs running as far as the level of the greater trochanter.
