= Hip pointer =

Bruise on the pelvis from blunt trauma

Iliac Crest
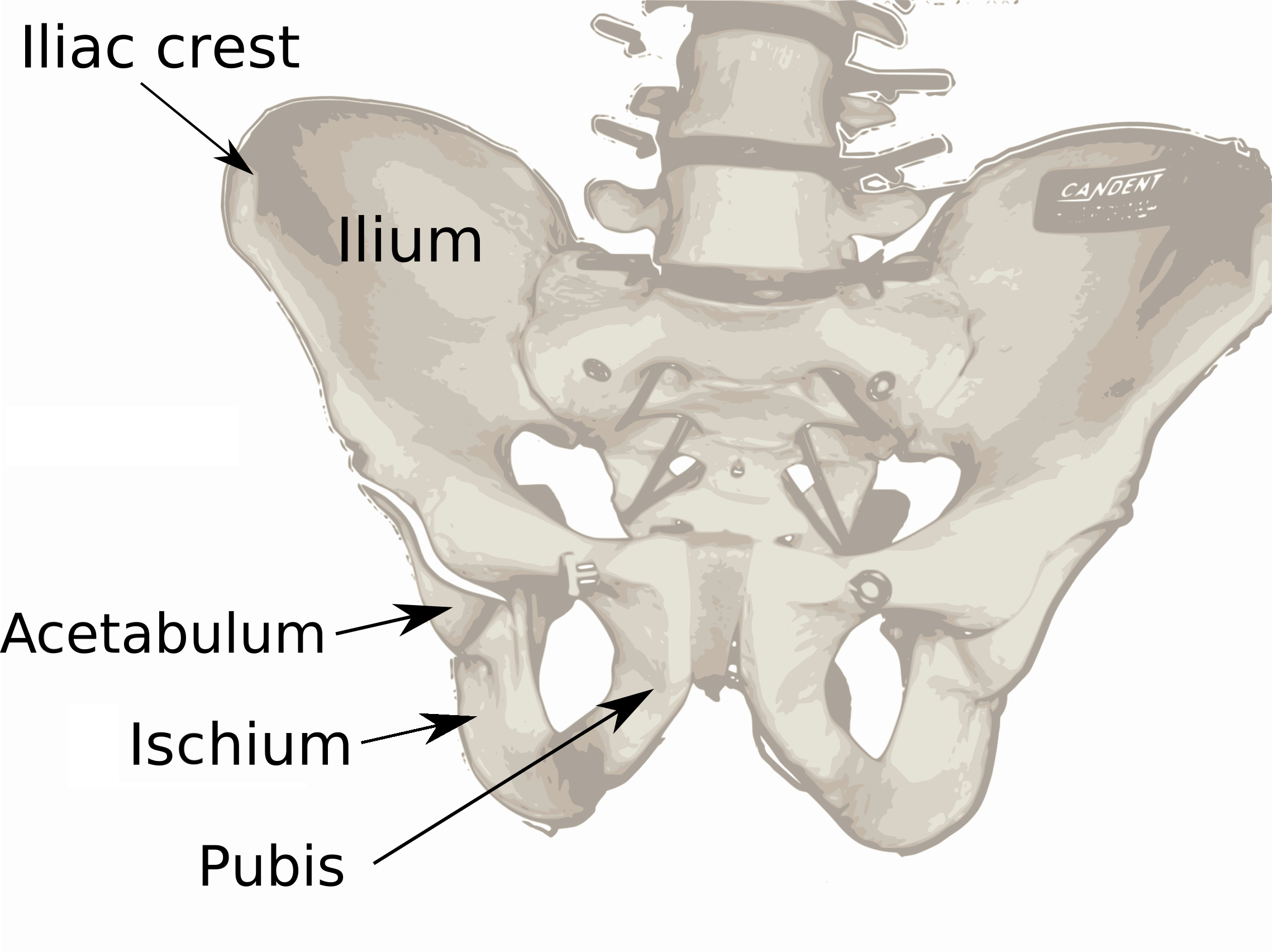
- Overview of Ilium as largest bone of the pelvis.

Details

Identifiers
- Latin: os ilii

A hip pointer is a contusion on the pelvis caused by a direct blow or a bad fall at an iliac crest and/or hip bone and a bruise of the abdominal muscles (transverse and oblique abdominal muscles). Surrounding structures such as the tensor fasciae latae and the greater trochanter may also be affected. The injury results from the crushing of soft tissue between a hard object and the iliac crest. Contact sports are a common cause of this type of injury, most often in football and hockey in general due to improper equipment and placement. The direct impact can cause an avulsion fracture where a portion of bone is removed by a muscle. The pain is due to the cluneal nerve that runs right along the iliac crest, which makes this a very debilitating injury. This pain can be felt when walking, laughing, coughing or even breathing deeply.

A hip pointer bruise usually causes bleeding into the hip abductor muscles, which move legs sideways, away from the midline of the body. This bleeding into muscle tissue creates swelling and makes leg movement painful. The hematoma that occurs can potentially build on the femoral nerve or lateral cutaneous of the femur. This injury usually lasts from one to six weeks, depending on the damage. In most cases, patients recover completely. A full assessment should be undertaken to rule out the possibility of damage to abdominal organs.

== Signs and symptoms ==
Signs and symptoms include immediate pain, bruising and swelling, obvious weakness, spasms and a rapid decline in the hip / leg function, resulting in a decreased range of motion.

MRI is usually needed to diagnose this condition.

== Management ==
Rest, Ice, Compression and Elevation (RICE) are standard treatments in the first 48 hours of an injury to the hip pointer. After 48 hours, patients can begin gently stretching, strengthening exercises, flexibility and coordination. For the first 7–10 days, patients can take anti-inflammatories such as ibuprofen and apply ice. Since this injury is very painful, recovery is usually very slow. When the person is without pain, sports massage and range-of-motion activities may reduce tension and swelling and prevent scar tissue buildup. Furthermore, an injection of corticosteroids into the affected area may reduce symptoms in the short term and accelerate rehabilitation. Operative treatment is rarely indicated and is reserved for patients with significant displacement or fractures of the bones.

To prevent hip pointer, the equipment must be adequate in the sport and be well positioned and good size. It should also maintain excellent flexibility, strength and endurance of the hip, pelvis and lower back muscles.
