= Joint stability =

Ability of the musculoskeletal system to enable precise motion about a joint

Joint stability refers to the resistance offered by various musculoskeletal tissues that surround a skeletal joint. Several subsystems ensure the stability of a joint. These are the passive, active and neural subsystems. It is believed that one or more of the subsystems must have failed if joint instability occurs, usually a torn or overstretched ligament. Instability of joints can cause unhealthy ranges of movement in joints, which can result in the joints fracturing.

The bony components that may relate to the potential for joint instability can be measured by use of x-rays. Plain film lateral x-rays can be used to evaluate for translations anteriorly (anterolisthesis) or posteriorly (retrolisthesis). Where plain films indicate the likelihood of these translations being significant, flexion-extension views can be utilized to determine the dynamic range of movement of joints. This allows for a more accurate view of any potential instability issues.

== See also ==
- Ligamentous laxity
