= Foraminoplasty =

- Specialty: Neurology

Foraminoplasty is a type of endoscopic surgery used to operate on the spine. The aim is to widen the intervertebral foramen.

It is considered a minimally invasive surgery technique and its endoscopic laser is legally regulated. Although most patients have benefited from foraminoplasty, the National Institute for Health and Care Excellence does not fully support it due to it not completing its randomised controlled clinical trial.
