= Facet syndrome =

- Other names: Facet joint disease, facet osteoarthritis, facet hypertrophy, facet arthritis
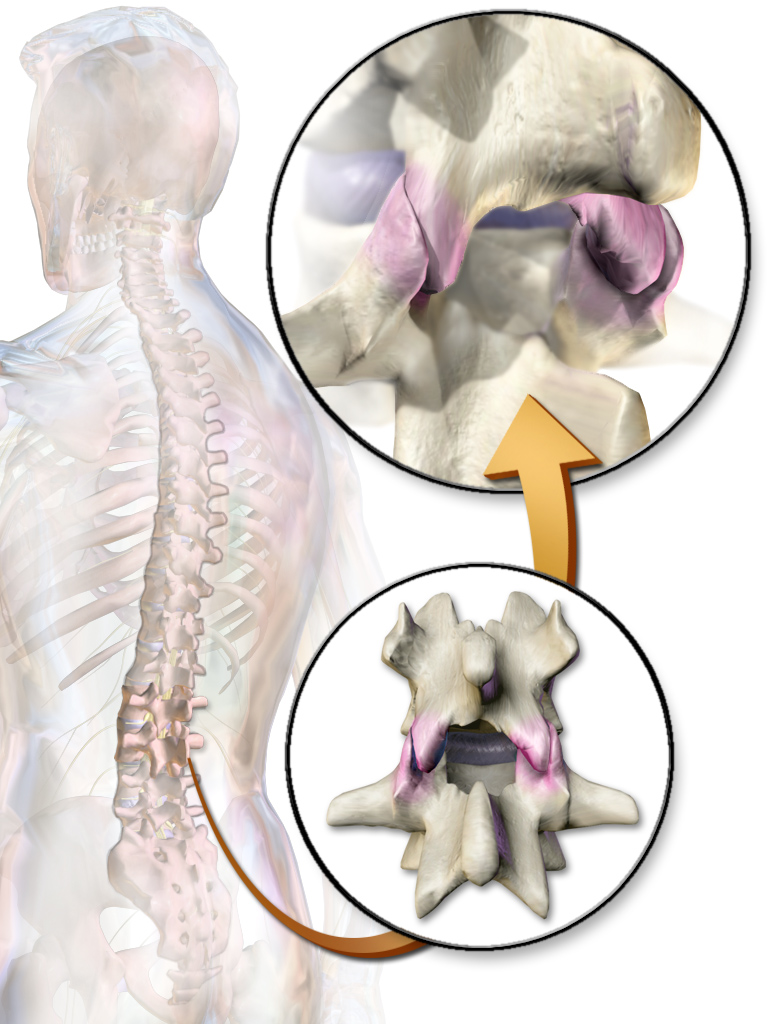
- Facet joint
- Specialty: Orthopedics
- Diagnostic method: X-ray, MRI

Facet syndrome is a syndrome in which the facet joints (synovial diarthroses) cause painful symptoms. In conjunction with degenerative disc disease, a distinct but functionally related condition, facet arthropathy is believed to be one of the most common causes of lower back pain.

== Signs and symptoms ==
The symptoms of facet joint arthropathy depend entirely on the location of the degenerated spinal joint, the severity of the damage and the amount of pressure that is being placed on the surrounding structures. It's important to note that the amount of pain a person experiences does not correlate well with the amount of degeneration that has occurred within the joint. Many people experience little or no pain while others, with exactly the same amount of pathology, experience chronic pain.

Additionally, in symptomatic facet arthropathy the location of the degenerated joint plays a significant role in the symptoms that are experienced. People with degenerated joints in the upper spine will often feel pain radiating throughout the upper neck and shoulders (cervical facet syndrome.) That said, symptoms often manifest themselves in the lumbar spine, since they are highest here due to the overlying body weight, mobility and geometry. Affected persons usually feel dull pain in the lumbar spine that can radiate into the buttocks and legs. Typically, the pain is worsened by stress on the facet joints, e.g. by lumbar extension and loading (the basis of the Kemp test) or lateral flexion but also by prolonged standing or walking.

Pain associated with facet syndrome is often called "referred pain" because symptoms do not follow a specific nerve root pattern. This is why patients experiencing symptomatic facet syndrome can feel pain in their shoulders, legs and even manifested in the form of headaches.

== Cause ==
Like many other joints throughout the human body, facets can experience natural degeneration from normal aging. Over time, the cartilage within the joints can naturally begin to wear out, allowing it to become thin or disappear entirely which, in turn, allows the conjoining vertebrae to rub directly against one another with little or no lubricant or separation. A result of this rubbing is often swelling, inflammation causing pain.

Over time, the body will naturally respond to the instability within the spine by developing bone spurs, thickened ligaments or even synovial cysts that contact nerve roots exiting the spinal column.

While primarily caused through natural wear and tear and degeneration, facet syndrome can also occur as a result of injury to the spine, or lifestyle choices. These causes can include:

- Osteoarthritis
- Spondylolisthesis
- Obesity
- Smoking
- Malnutrition
- Trauma such as a car accident, fall or sports injury.
- Lack of physical exercise or daily activity (questionably)

== Pathophysiology ==
55% of facet syndrome cases occur in cervical vertebrae, and 31% in lumbar. Spinal osteoarthritis is known as spondylosis. Pathology of the C1-C2 (atlantoaxial) joint, the most mobile of all vertebral segments, accounts for 4% of all spondylosis.

=== Facet joints ===
The facet joints are formed by the superior and inferior processes of each vertebra. The first cervical vertebra has an inferior articulating surface but, as it does not restrict lateral or posterior translation, is not always considered a proper zygoma (zygoma is Greek for "yoke", i.e. something that restrains movement). In the lumbar spine, facets provide about 20 percent of the twisting stability in the low back. Each facet joint is positioned at each level of the spine to provide the needed support especially with rotation.

Facet joints also prevent each vertebra from slipping over the one below. A small capsule surrounds each facet joint providing a nourishing lubricant for the joint. Also, each joint has a rich supply of tiny nerve fibers that provide a painful stimulus when the joint is injured or irritated. Inflamed facets can cause a powerful muscle spasm.

== Diagnosis ==
Facet arthropathy or 'facet syndrome' can typically be diagnosed through a physical examination, MRI, x-rays and/or a diagnostic block into the suspected joint.

== Treatment ==
In general, anti-inflammatory drugs are prescribed initially. This medical treatment is usually accompanied by physiotherapy to increase back and stomach muscles. Thus, the spine can be both relieved and stabilized. If these conservative measures do not bring about betterment, minimally invasive procedures such as a facet infiltration can be conducted to offer relief. In this procedure, a local anesthetic is injected directly into the respective joint, usually in combination with a cortisone preparation (corticosteroid). For long-term relief in more severe cases, radio-frequency ablation or rhizotomy, where the anterior and posterior spinal nerve root is burnt may be performed.

== See also ==
- Facet joint arthrosis
