= Pars interarticularis =

Part of the vertebra

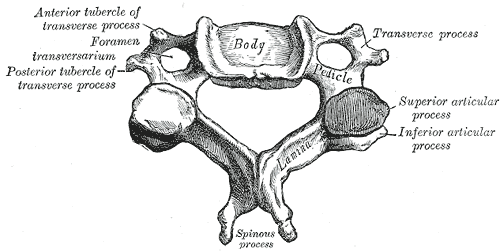
Cervical vertebra.

The pars interarticularis, or pars for short, is the part of a vertebra located between the inferior and superior articular processes of the facet joint.

In the transverse plane, it lies between the lamina and pedicle. In other words, in the axial view, it is the bony mass between the facets that is anterior to the lamina and posterior to the pedicle. It is abnormal in spondylolysis, either due to fracture or congenitally. Bilateral C2 pars fractures are known as a variant of the hangman's fracture.

On an anterior oblique radiograph of the lumbar spine, the pars is the neck of the imaginary Scottie dog; the Scottie dog's eye is the pedicle, its hindlegs the spinous process, its nose the transverse process, its ear the superior articular facet and its forelegs the inferior articular facet.

Stress fractures of the pars interarticularis are known to be associated with playing sports such as volleyball, although the mechanism is somewhat unclear. Patients with spina bifida occulta have an increased risk for spondylolysis.

== See also ==
- Terms for anatomical location
