= Facet joint injection =

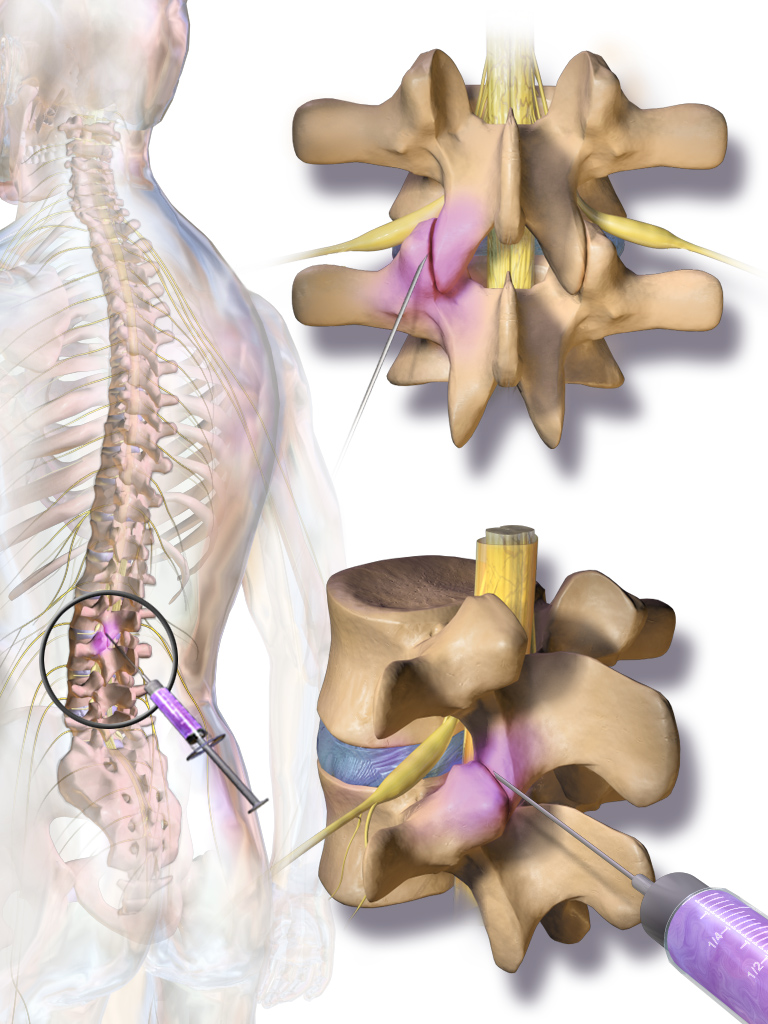
- Facet joint injection
- Other names: orthopedics

Facet joint injections are used to alleviate symptoms of Facet syndrome. The procedure is an outpatient surgery, so that the patient can go home on the same day. It usually takes 10–20 minutes, but may take up to 30 minutes if the patient needs an IV for relaxation. Facet joint injections came into use from 1963, when Hirsch injected a hypertonic solution of saline into facet joints. He found that this solution relieved lower back pain in the sacroiliac and gluteal regions of the spine. In 1979 fluoroscopy was used for guidance of the needle into the facet joints with steroids and local anesthetics.

== Purpose ==
Facet joint injections can be used to diagnose the facet joints as the source of pain. When the facet joint is numbed, there should be pain relief. If the pain is not relieved, there could be another underlying issue that is causing the pain. Facet joint injections are mainly used as a therapeutic to relieve back pain caused by the facet joints. The numbing injection provides temporary relief and the anti-inflammatory mixture provides long term relief.

== Procedure ==
The patient lies face down on the table. The area of the spine that will be treated (lower back, mid back, upper back) is sterilely cleansed with an antibacterial solution using aseptic techniques. The antibacterial solution usually contains iodine and alcohol. A local anesthetic, like Bupivacaine, is injected into the area to numb the joint. The patient might feel a slight sting. Imaging guidance is used to direct the needle into the facet joint. The type of imaging system used depends on the preference of the doctor. It is usually fluoroscopy using CT or x-ray guidance. CT fluoroscopy increases the precision of the needle placement. Others may use ultrasound or magnetic resonance guidance. Contrast dye is injected into the facet joint to assure that the needle is in the correct place. Once confirmed, a mixture of an anesthetic and anti-inflammatory medication, is slowly injected into the joint. The needle is then released. The injection can be used to treat any facet joint that is causing pain, so this procedure may need to be repeated for the adjacent facet joints.

IV sedation can be used for anxious patients to help them sit still. Doctors try to avoid this because it interferes with a patient's pain response, which is needed to determine which facet joint is the source of the pain. If the patient chooses to have the sedation, they can't eat or drink 4–6 hours prior to the procedure.

== Effectiveness ==
Examination of the evidence on the effectiveness of facet joint injection has suggested that it has little effect. A 2026 systematic review found that facet joint injections were no more effective than placebo injections at reducing chronic lower back pain or improving physical functioning. In 2018 the Lancet published a series of papers by a group of many international experts on the extent of back pain and evidence for treatments. The authors were scathing about the widespread use of "inappropriate tests" and "unnecessary, ineffective and harmful treatments". On facet joint injection it was stated that "Injecting facet joints with local anaesthetic can cause temporary relief of pain; however, the Framingham Heart Study (3529 participants) did not find an association between radiological osteoarthritis of facet joints and presence of low back pain." One of the authors, Prof. Martin Underwood at Warwick Medical School, said that facet joint injections "are very widely used in the public and private sectors. There is no evidence to support their use, but nevertheless the numbers done in the NHS go up year on year".

The UK National Institute for Health and Care Excellence (NICE) gives the official recommendation "1.3.1 Do not offer spinal injections for managing low back pain".

== Side effects and complications ==
The most common side effects from this procedure include itching, rash, nausea, facial flushing/sweating. Some patients experience temporary weight gain due to the steroid. Diabetics may experience an increase in blood sugar. This is a quick and simple procedure, so complications are very rare, but should not be ignored. The risk of complications is decreased when proper aseptic technique is followed, and by the use of the imaging guidance. These complications include an epidural abscess due to infection, temporary increased pain, puncture of the sack containing spinal fluid, excess bleeding, nerve damage, leakage of local anesthetic into the spinal canal, and spondylodiscitis (disc inflammation). Most of the symptoms last 24–48 hours and are usually relieved by a cold compress and NSAIDS. The numbness should wear off in a few hours.

=== Prevention ===
Individuals taking Coumadin or any blood-thinning medications must come off this medication 4–7 days before the injection. The doctor should be aware of any allergies to steroids or anesthetics. Any ongoing active infections should be discussed with the doctor as well. Antiplatelet drugs must be stopped 5–10 days before this procedure. History of anxiety or the inability to sit still should be mentioned to the doctor to prevent any movement during the procedure.

== After procedure ==
After the procedure, the patient waits in the room for 20–30 minutes to look for any immediate side effects. The patient is then evaluated to see if the injection worked. The patient is asked to perform certain movements that would normally aggravate their pain. If pain is still present, the wrong facet joint may have been targeted, or the facet joints were not the source of pain. Normally it takes 3–5 days for the pain to be completely relieved. Patients' can return to their normal activities the day after the procedure. Physical therapy is not normally needed. The injection is usually performed up to 3 times a year.

== See also ==
- Facet syndrome
- Facet joint
