= Scottie dog sign =

Pattern seen in radiologic examinations

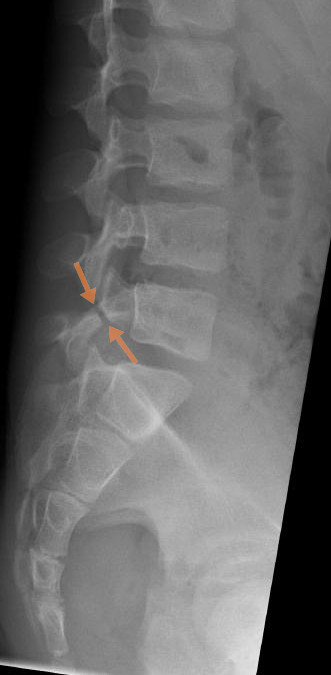
- X-ray of lateral lumbar spine showing spondylolysis of L5/S1

Scottie dog sign is a radiological sign which refers to the appearance of the lumbar spine in an oblique view X-ray. It was once used as a diagnostic sign in X-rays for lumbar spondylolysis, but it is not commonly in use nowadays because of the advent of more sensitive diagnostic methods such as the CT scan and MRI scan.

== Radiological appearance ==
On lumbar x-ray, a Scottie dog can be seen laterally, with the pedicle as the eye, transverse process as the nose, superior articular facet as the ear, spinous process as the body, and inferior articular facet as the front leg. The pars interarticularis defect presents itself as the neck of the dog. Since plain radiographs have limitations and are not as sensitive, initial diagnosis is made by plain xray followed by MRIs to confirm the diagnosis. CT scans are then used to rule out other lesions and to assess healing during treatment.

== Clinical relevance ==
=== Risk factors ===
Environmental stress such as repetitive motion or weight bearing is a common risk factor for developing spondylosis. There is a proportionate increase in relation to age up until the age of 18, presumed to be due to weight bearing. Although spondylolysis is less common in children, it is the leading cause of low back pain in adolescent athletes, especially those in spinal extension-intensive sports such as gymnastics, baseball, rowing, and soccer. Race and sex may also play a role, as Caucasian males are most commonly affected, followed by African American males, Caucasian females, and African American females. Spinal deformities also put patients at a higher risk of spondylolysis. A study in Japan showed patients with spina bifida occulta had an almost four times increase in the incidence of spondylolysis, likely due to failure of vertebral arch fusion leading to increased stress on the pars interarticularis and eventually its fracture. Patients with Scheuermann's kyphosis have also been reported to have a thirty to fifty percent incidence rate of spondylolysis, likely due to the anatomical nature of lumbar lordosis and excessive lumbar extension.

=== Symptoms ===
Spondylolysis most commonly presents asymptomatic and found incidentally on imaging, however, its most common complaint is lower back pain that is relieved with rest and aggravated by movement. On physical exam, midline tenderness also a sign of spondylolysis.

=== Management ===
First line therapy for patients with spondylolysis is conservative management such as restricting activity, physical therapy, bracing, and external electrical stimulation. Each of these therapies can be used individually, however, there's greater efficacy and recovery with combination therapy. Conservative treatment's goal is to heal the spinal defect, prevent worsening of the lesion, and provide symptomatic relief for the patient. Typically spinal bracing is used after a failed trial of activity modification and is seen more effective in younger patients, likely due to decreased initiation of bone healing. External electrical stimulation can also be used to repair bone fractures by increasing bone-forming stem cells, inducing mineralization of the bone, forming extracellular matrix, and increasing the expression of osteogenic genes. Studies show the combination of cessation of sports, spinal bracing, and bone stimulator followed by physical therapy and rehab in adolescent athletes with spondylolysis results in great outcomes such as resuming sports.

Surgical treatment such as decompression or decompression and fusion is considered when over 6 months conservative therapy fails to decrease pain, associated symptoms, along with persistent fracture shown on imaging. Decompression consists of a laminectomy, which removes part of the vertebra, while fusion joins the vertebrae together. Decompression alone is an option if the spine appears to be stable with an intact posterior arch, however, not recommended as there's a twenty five to thirty percent progression to slippage. Decompression and fusion is the primary surgical treatment for spondylolysis as it's more stable.
