= Ligamentous laxity =

Looseness of the ligaments

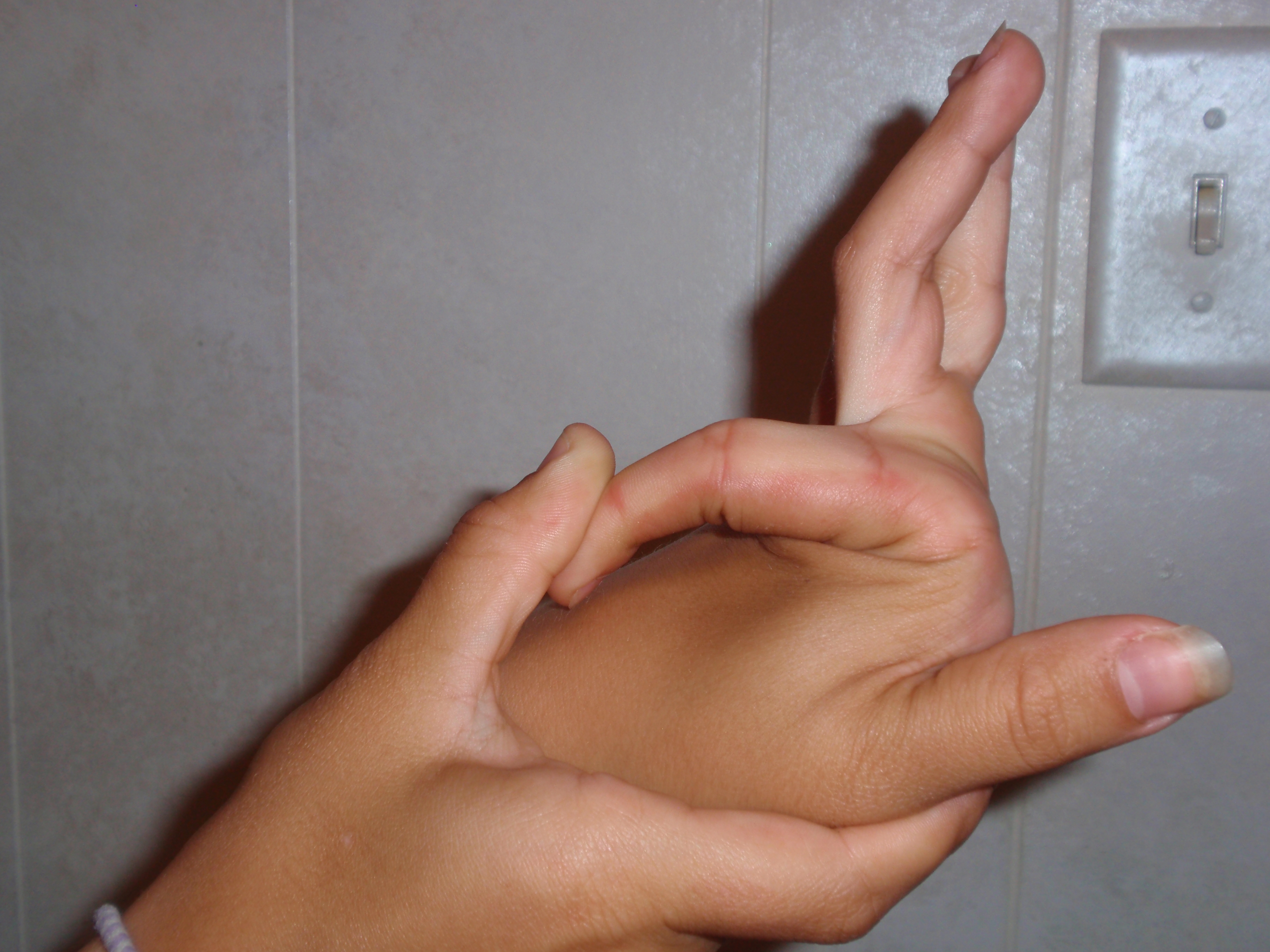
- Hypermobile finger
- Specialty: Orthopaedics, Medical genetics

Ligamentous laxity or ligament laxity can appear in a variety of ways and levels of severity.

In most people, ligaments (which are the tissues that connect bones to each other) are naturally tight in such a way that the joints are restricted to 'normal' ranges of motion. This creates normal joint stability. If muscular control does not compensate for ligamentous laxity, joint instability may result. The trait is almost certainly hereditary, and is usually something the affected person would just be aware of, rather than a serious medical condition. However, if there is widespread laxity of other connective tissue, then this may be a sign of Ehlers–Danlos syndrome, Down syndrome, Klippel–Feil syndrome, juvenile idiopathic arthritis, Larsen syndrome, Marfan syndrome, osteogenesis imperfecta, and other medical conditions.

Ligamentous laxity may also result from injury, such as from a vehicle accident. It can result from whiplash and be overlooked for years by doctors who are not looking for it, despite the chronic pain that accompanies the resultant spinal instability. Ligamentous laxity will show up on an upright magnetic resonance imaging (MRI), the only kind of MRI that will show soft tissue damage. It can only be inferred from a digital motion x-ray.
