= Spondylolisthesis =

Displacement of one spinal vertebra compared to another

- Other names: Olisthesis
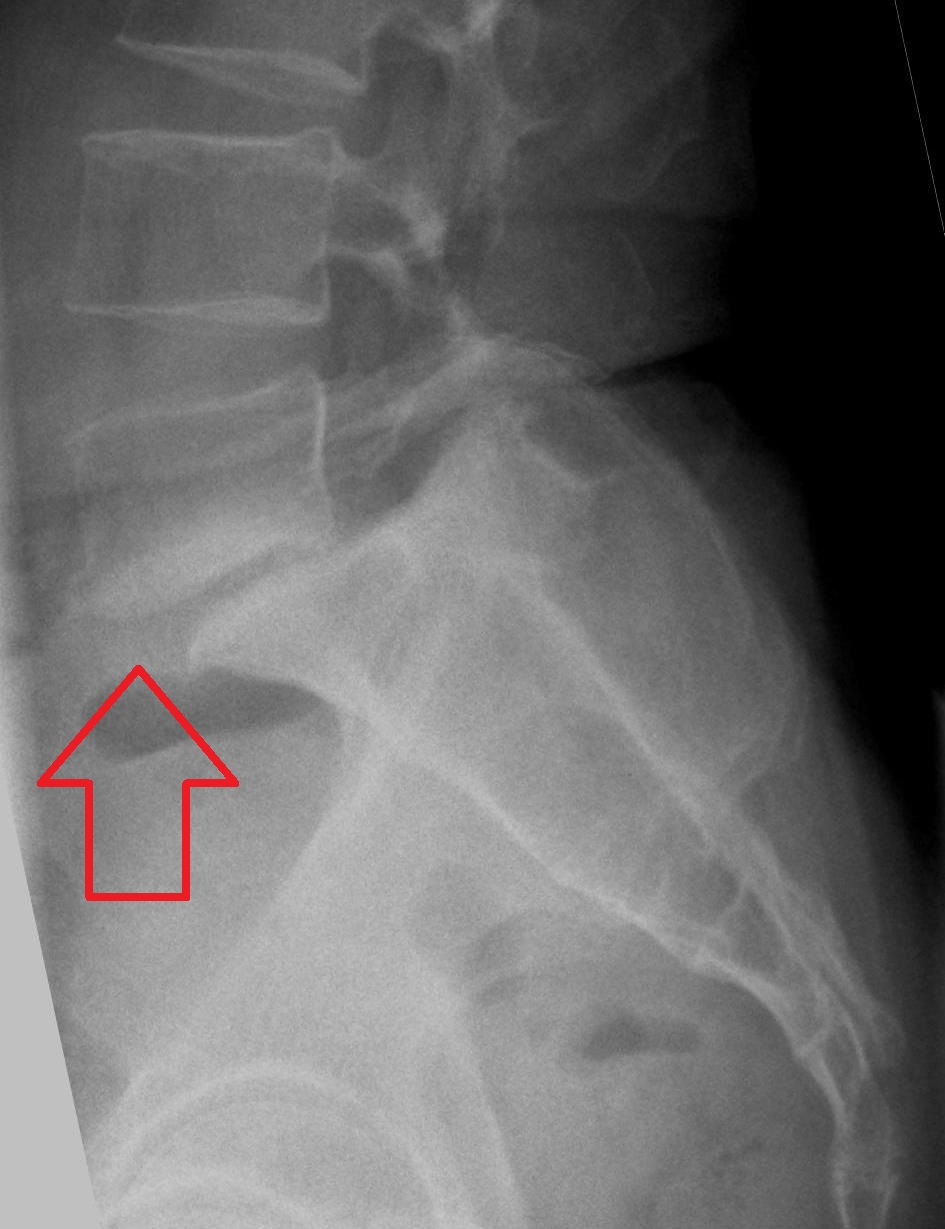
- X-ray of the lateral lumbar spine with a grade III anterolisthesis at the L5-S1 level
- Pronunciation: /ˌspɒndɪloʊlɪsˈθiːsɪs/ SPON-dil-oh-lis-THEE-sis
- Specialty: Orthopedics

Spondylolisthesis refers to a condition in which one spinal vertebra slips out of place compared to another. While some medical dictionaries define spondylolisthesis specifically as the forward or anterior displacement of a vertebra over the vertebra inferior to it (or the sacrum), it is often defined in medical textbooks as displacement in any direction.

Spondylolisthesis is graded based upon the degree of slippage of one vertebral body relative to the subsequent adjacent vertebral body. Spondylolisthesis is classified as one of the six major etiologies: degenerative, traumatic, dysplastic, isthmic, pathologic, or post-surgical. Spondylolisthesis most commonly occurs in the lumbar spine, primarily at the L5-S1 level, with the L5 vertebral body anteriorly translating over the S1 vertebral body.

== Types ==
Olisthesis (synonym olisthy) is a term that more explicitly denotes displacement in any direction. Forward or anterior displacement can specifically be called anterolisthesis. Anterolisthesis commonly involves the fifth lumbar vertebra. Backward displacement is called retrolisthesis. Lateral displacement is called lateral listhesis or laterolisthesis.

A hangman's fracture is a specific type of spondylolisthesis where the second cervical vertebra (C2) is displaced anteriorly relative to the C3 vertebra due to fractures of the C2 vertebra's pedicles.

== Anterolisthesis ==
=== Classification ===
Anterolisthesis can be categorized by cause, location, and severity.

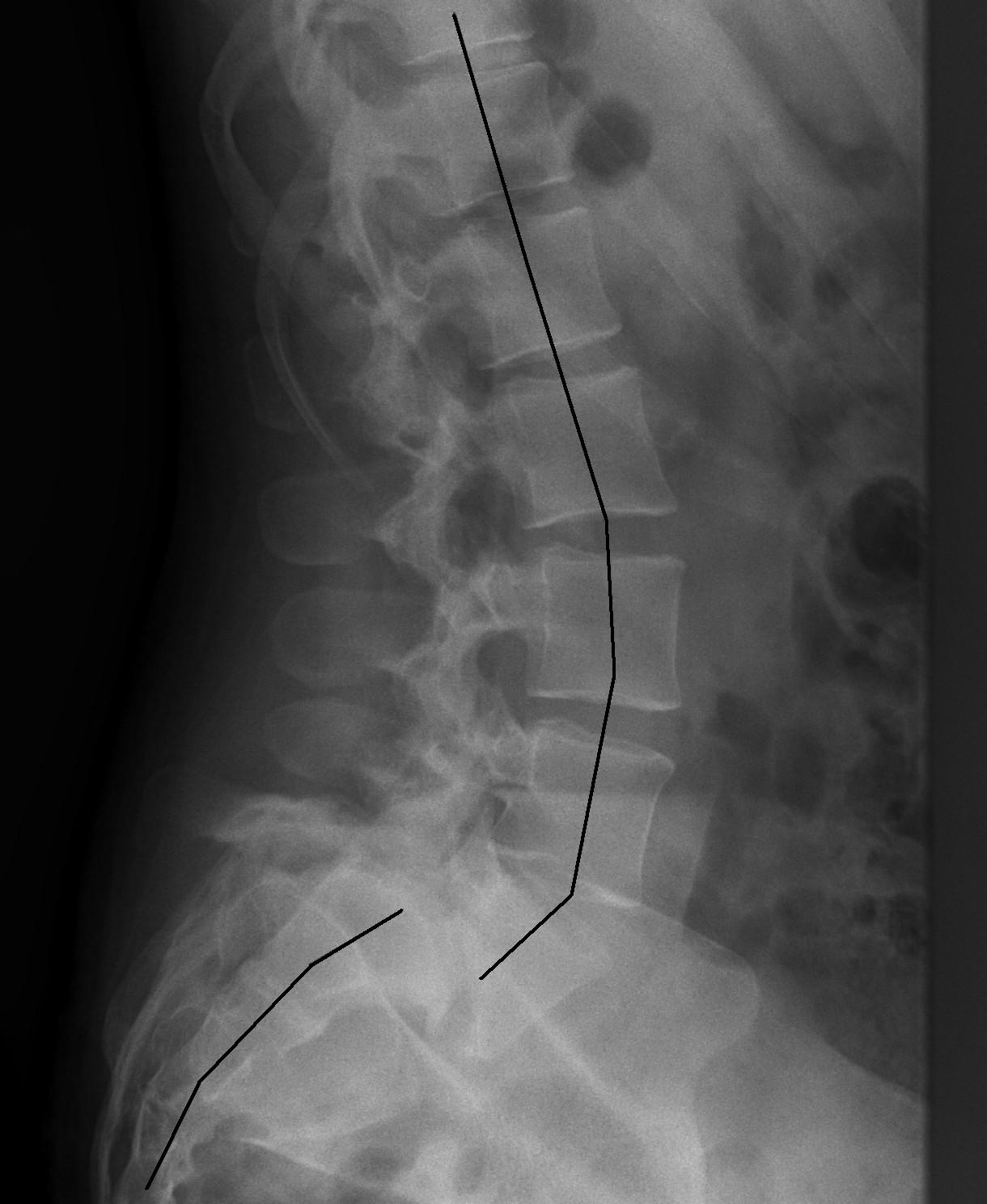
X-ray of a grade 4 anterolisthesis at L5-S1 with spinal misalignment indicated

==== By causes ====
- Dysplastic anterolisthesis (also called type 1) results from congenital abnormalities of the upper sacral facets or inferior facets of the fifth lumbar vertebra, and accounts for 14% to 21% of all anterolisthesis.
- Isthmic anterolisthesis (also called type 2) is caused by a defect in the pars interarticularis (spondylolysis) but it can also be seen with an elongated pars.
- Degenerative anterolisthesis (also called type 3) is a disease of the older adult that develops as a result of facet arthritis and joint remodeling. Joint arthritis, and ligamentum flavum weakness, may result in slippage of a vertebra. Degenerative forms are more likely to occur in women, persons older than fifty, and African Americans.
- Traumatic anterolisthesis (also called type 4) is rare and results from acute fractures in the neural arch or facet joint structure, other than the pars.
- Pathologic anterolisthesis (also called type 5) is caused by either infection or a malignancy.
- Post-surgical/iatrogenic anterolisthesis (also called type 6) is caused by complications after surgery.

==== By location ====
Anterolisthesis location includes which vertebrae are involved, and may also specify which parts of the vertebrae are affected.

Isthmic anterolisthesis is where there is a defect in the pars interarticularis (spondylolysis). It is the most common form of spondylolisthesis; also called spondylolytic spondylolisthesis, it occurs with a reported prevalence of 5–7 percent in the US population. A slip or fracture of the intravertebral joint is usually acquired between the ages of 6 and 16 years, but remains unnoticed until adulthood. Roughly 90 percent of these isthmic slips are low-grade (less than 50 percent slip) and 10 percent are high-grade (greater than 50 percent slip). It is divided into three subtypes:

- A: pars fatigue fracture
- B: pars elongation due to multiple healed stress effects
- C: pars acute fracture

==== Severity ====
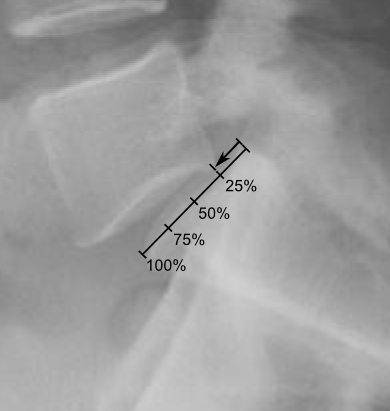
X-ray of measurement of spondylolisthesis at the lumbosacral joint, being 25% (grade 1) in this example

Classification by degree of the slippage, as measured as percentage of the width of the vertebral body: Grade I spondylolisthesis accounts for approximately 75% of all cases.

- Grade I: 0–25%
- Grade II: 25–50%
- Grade III: 50–75%
- Grade IV: 75–100%
- Grade V: greater than 100%

==== Instability ====
If the spondylolisthesis is mobile or increases its position with movements such as bending forwards (flexion) or backwards (extension), it's called 'unstable'. Instability, or a lot of movement in the spine, is considered significant if there's more than 4 mm of movement (translation) or more than a 10° change in the angle of the spine when moving.

There are several ways doctors can see this instability on radiographic findings, such as the vertebra moving out of place, the angle of the disc between the vertebrae, the height of the disc, the direction of the joints at the back of the vertebrae, the presence of fluid in these joints, and the severity of any degenerative changes. The condition can be static or dynamic. "Static" means the bone stays in the same slipped position, whether bending forward or backward. "Dynamic" means the bone moves more when changing positions.

Traditionally, most medical professionals rely on flexion-extension radiographs to see instability. However, there are some concerns about the reliability of this method. This is because the techniques used to take the X-rays are not standardized and can vary, which can lead to an underestimation of the movement between the vertebrae^{.} Therefore, comparing two other types of scans could give more useful information for instability, where an X-ray is taken when the patient is standing and bending forward (flexion) and an MRI is taken when the patient is lying flat on their back (supine sagittal).

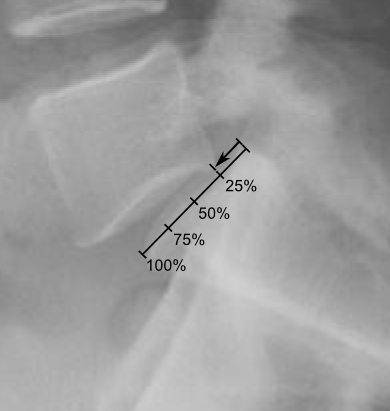
X-ray of measurement of spondylolisthesis at the lumbosacral joint, being 25% (grade 1) in this example

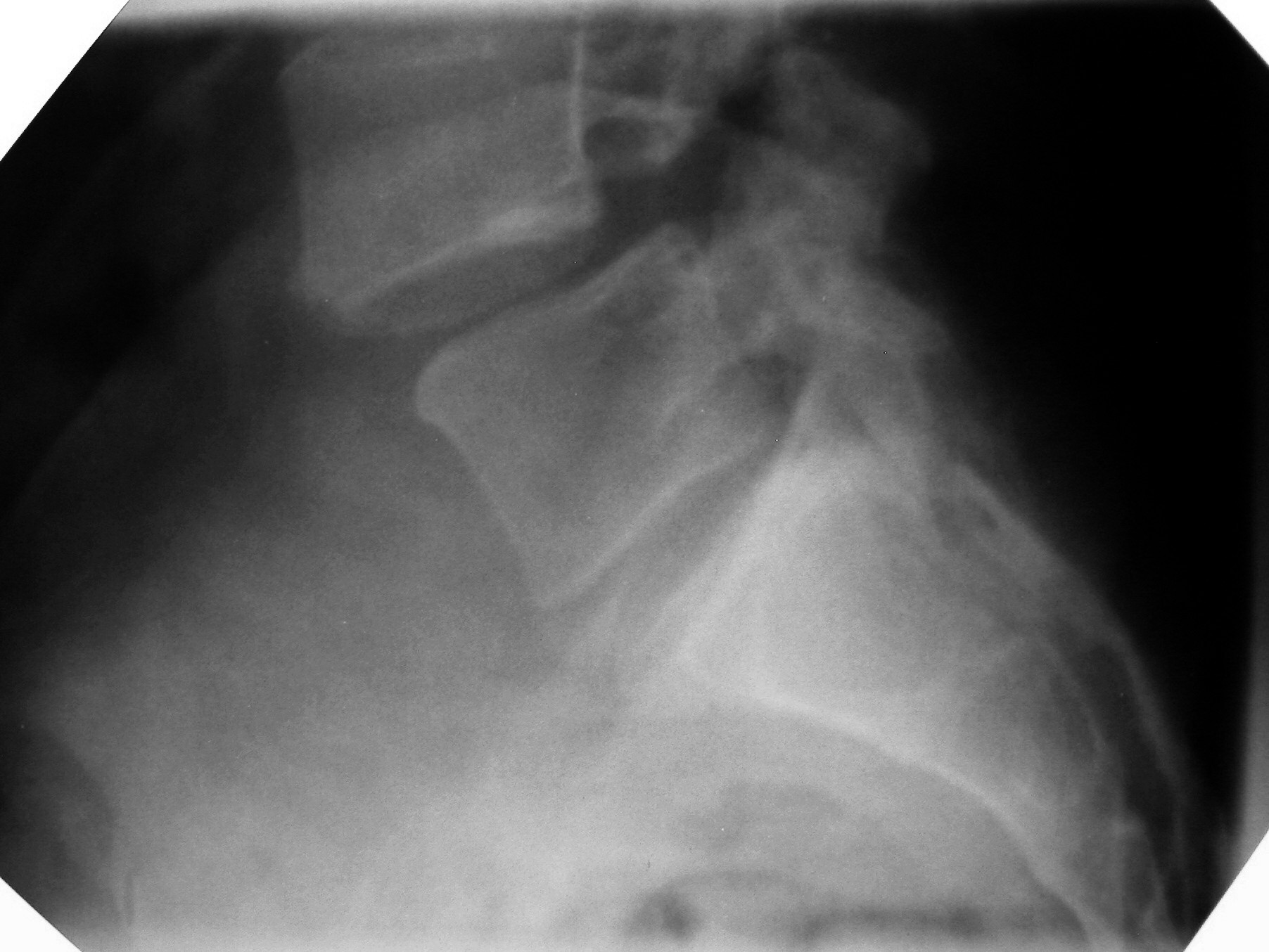
X-ray picture of a grade 1 isthmic anterolisthesis at L4-5

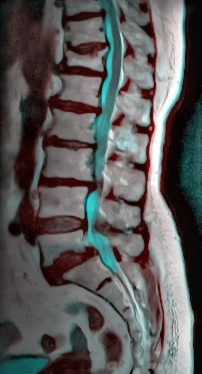
MRI of L5-S1 anterolisthesis

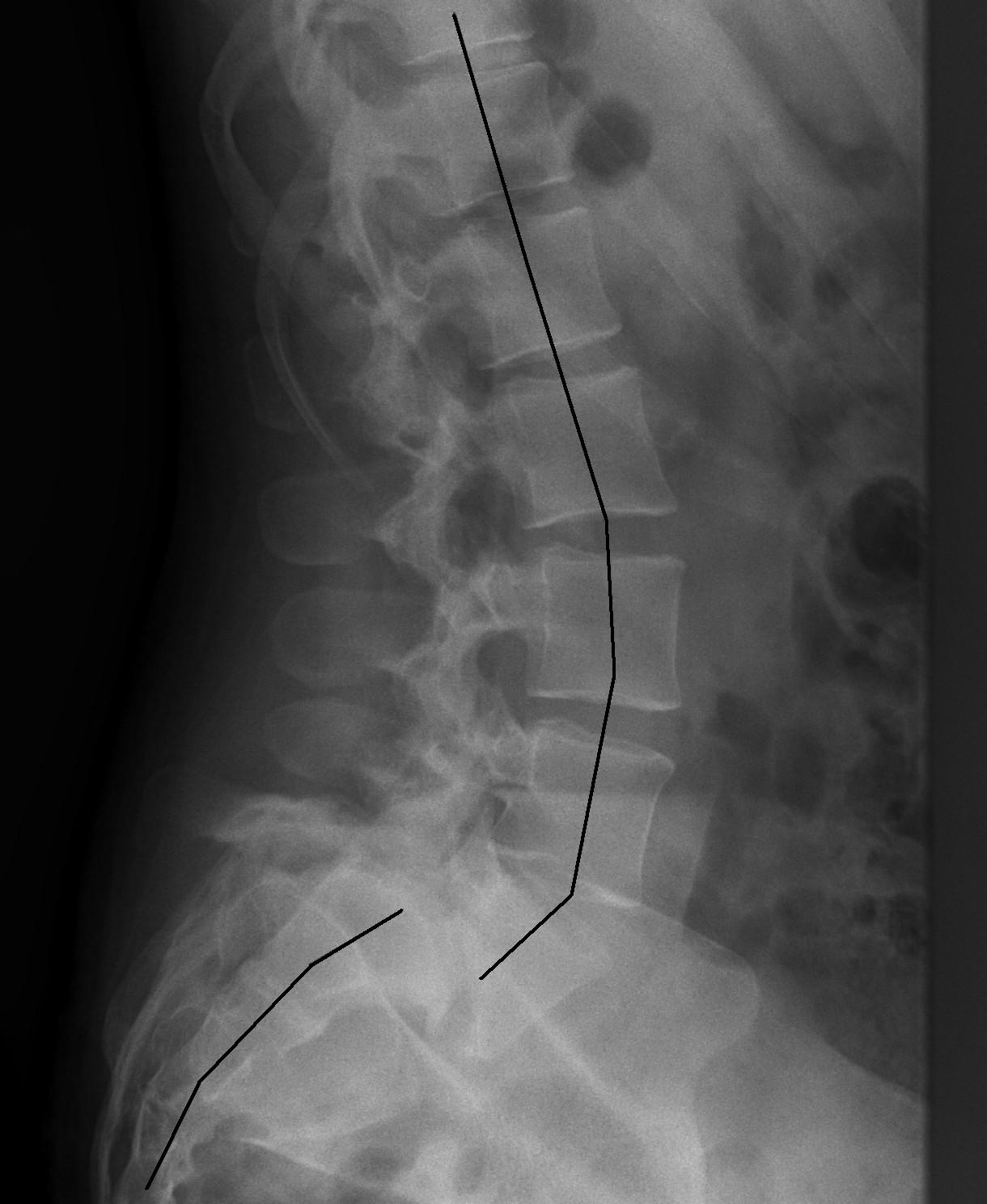
X-ray of a grade 4 anterolisthesis at L5-S1 with spinal misalignment indicated

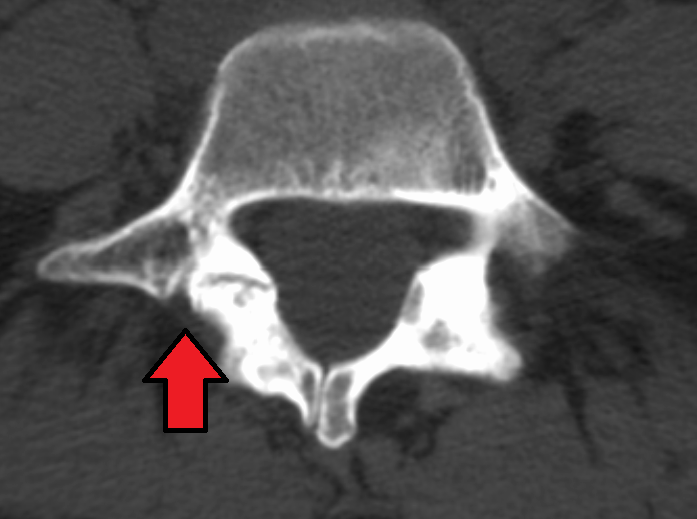
Anterolisthesis L5/S1

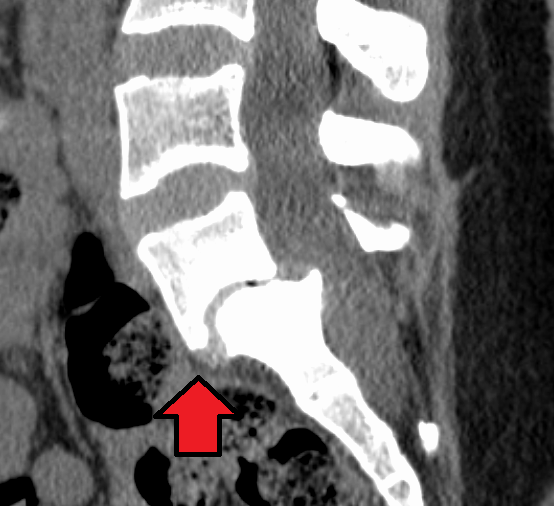
Anterolisthesis L5/S1

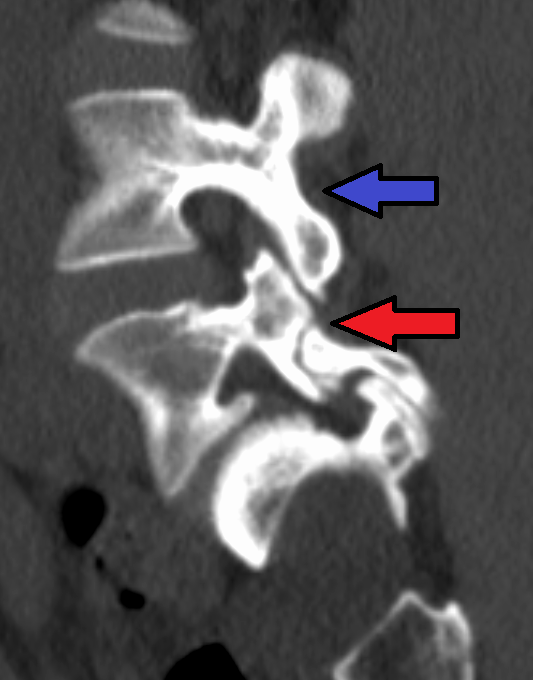
Anterolisthesis L5/S1. Blue arrow normal pars interarticularis. Red arrow is a break in pars interarticularis.

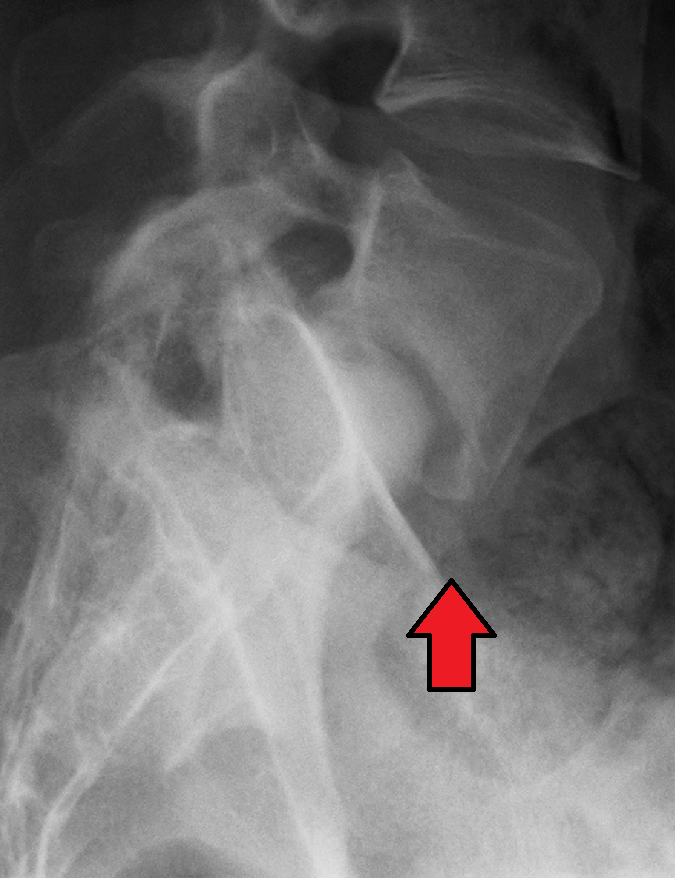
Anterolisthesis L5/S1

== Signs and symptoms ==
Symptoms of lumbar anterolisthesis include:

- A general stiffening of the back and a tightening of the hamstrings, with a resulting change in both posture and gait.
- A leaning-forward or semi-kyphotic posture may be seen, due to compensatory changes.
- A "waddle" may be seen in more advanced causes, due to compensatory pelvic rotation due to decreased lumbar spine rotation.
- A result of the change in gait is often a noticeable atrophy in the gluteal muscles due to lack of use.
- Generalized lower-back pain may also be seen, with intermittent shooting pain from the buttocks to the posterior thigh, and/or lower leg via the sciatic nerve.

Other symptoms may include tingling and numbness. Coughing and sneezing can intensify the pain. An individual may also note a "slipping sensation" when moving into an upright position. Sitting and trying to stand up may be painful and difficult.

== Physical exam ==
The major components of the physical exam for spondylolisthesis consists of observation, palpation, and maneuvers. The most common finding is pain with lumbar extension. The following physical involves specific assessment for spondylolisthesis. However, a general examination, most importantly neurological examination, must be done to rule out alternative causes for signs and symptoms. Neurological examination is often normal in patients with spondylolisthesis, but lumbosacral radiculopathy is commonly seen in patients with degenerate spondylolisthesis.

=== Observation ===
The patient should be observed walking and standing. Most patients present with a normal gait. An abnormal gait is often the sign of a high grade case. A patient with high grade spondylolisthesis may present with a posterior pelvic tilt, causing a loss in the normal contour of the buttocks. An antalgic gait, rounded back and decreased hip extension can result from severe pain. While standing, the patient should be observed from the front, back, and sides. Increased and decreased lumbar lordosis, inward curvature of the lower spine, has been seen.

=== Palpation ===
Detection of spondylolisthesis by palpation is most often done by palpating for the spinous process. Each level of the lumbar spine should be palpated. Spinous process palpation by itself is not a definitive method for the detection of spondylolisthesis.

=== Maneuvers ===
- Spinal range of motion testing – Range of motion limitations may be seen.
- Lumbar hyperextension – Extension often elicits pain. This can be assessed by having the patient hyperextend the lumbar spine, provide resistance against back extensions, or undergo repeated lumbar extensions.
- Sport-specific motion – Patient can be asked to repeat aggravating movements that they experience during their activity. During the movement, ask patient to point to any places with focal pain.
- Straight leg raise – Maneuver used to assess for hamstring tightness. The straight leg raise has been found to be positive in only 10% of patients with spondylolisthesis.
- Muscle strength exercises – Lower abdominal, gluteal, and lumbar extensors should be assessed for weakness. Weakness in these muscles can increase lordosis and contribute to sacroiliac instability. Abdominal flexor strength can be assessed with the abdominal flexor endurance test. The test involves the patient lying supine while holding a 45 degree flexed trunk and 90 degree flexed knees for 30 seconds. Gluteal strength can be assessed with a single-leg squat. Lastly, lumbar extension can be assessed with a single-leg bridge.

== Diagnostic imaging ==
In adults with non-specific low back pain, strong evidence suggests medical imaging should not be done within the first six weeks. It is also suggested to avoid advanced imaging, such as CT or MRI, for adults without neurological symptoms or "red flags" in the patient's history. General recommendations for initial low back pain treatment is remaining active, avoiding twisting and bending, avoiding activities that worsen pain, avoiding bed rest, and possibly initiating a trial of non-steroidal anti-inflammatory drugs after consulting a physician. Children and adolescents with persistent low back pain may require earlier imaging and should be seen by physician. Once imaging is deemed necessary, a combination of plain radiography, computed tomography, and magnetic resonance imaging may be used. Images are most often taken of the lumbar spine due to spondylolisthesis most commonly involving the lumbar region. Images of the thoracic spine can be taken if a patient's history and physical suggest thoracic involvement.

=== Plain radiography (X-ray) ===
Plain radiography is often the first step in medical imaging. Anteroposterior (front-back) and lateral (side) images are used to allow the physician to view the spine at multiple angles. Oblique view are no longer recommended. In evaluating for spondylolithesis, plain radiographs provide information on the positioning and structural integrity of the spine. Therefore, if further detail is needed, a physician may request advanced imaging.

=== Magnetic resonance imaging (MRI) ===
Magnetic resonance imaging is the preferred advanced imaging technique for evaluation of spondylolisthesis. Preference is due to effectiveness, lack of radiation exposure, and ability to evaluate for soft tissue abnormalities and spinal canal involvement. MRI is limited in its ability to evaluate fractures in great detail, compared to other advanced imaging modalities.

=== Computed tomography (CT) ===
Computed tomography can be helpful in evaluating bony vertebral abnormalities, such as fractures. This can be helpful in determining if the fracture is a new, old, and/or progressing fracture. CT use in spondylolisthesis evaluation is controversial due to high radiation exposure.

== Treatment ==
=== Conservative ===
Treatment is often guided by grade, etiology, the patient's symptoms, and examination findings. Instability is another factor to be considered.

Spondylolisthesis patients without symptoms do not need to be treated. Non-operative management, also referred to as conservative treatment, is the recommended treatment for spondylolisthesis in most cases with or without neurological symptoms. Most patients with spondylolisthesis respond to conservative treatment. Conservative treatment consists primarily of physical therapy, medication, intermittent bracing, aerobic exercise, pharmacological intervention, and epidural steroid injections. The majority of patients with degenerative spondylolisthesis do not require surgical intervention.

- Physical therapy can evaluate and address postural and compensatory movement abnormalities. Physical therapy primarily includes spinal flexion and extension exercises with a focus on core stabilization and muscle strengthening. In particular, lumbar spondylolisthesis may benefit from core stabilization exercises focusing on lower abdominal, lumbar muscles, hamstrings, and hip flexors, which may temporarily or permanently improve symptoms and improve general function.
- Some patients may benefit from bracing in combination with physical therapy. Additionally, bracing was found to be beneficial when performed immediately following the onset of symptoms, in particular patients with lumbar pars interarticular defects (spondylolysis).
- Exercises such as cycling, elliptical training, swimming, and walking are considered low-impact aerobic exercises and are recommended for pain relief.
- Anti-inflammatory medications (NSAIDS) in combination with paracetamol can be tried initially. If a severe radicular component is present, a short course of oral steroids such as prednisone or methylprednisolone can be considered. Epidural steroid injections, either interlaminal or transforaminal, performed under fluoroscopic guidance can help with severe radicular (leg) pain, but lacks conclusive benefit in relieving back pain in lumbar spondylolisthesis.

=== Surgical ===
There are no clear radiological or medical guidelines or indications for surgical interventions in degenerative spondylolisthesis. A minimum of three months of conservative management should be completed prior to considering surgical intervention. Three indications for potential surgical treatment are as follows: persistent or recurrent back pain or neurologic pain with a persistent reduction of quality of life despite a reasonable trial of conservative (non-operative) management, new or worsening bladder or bowel symptoms, or a new or worsening neurological deficit.

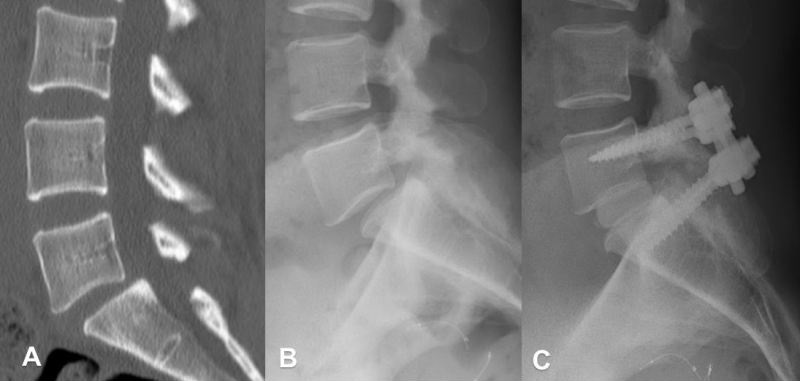
Degenerative spondylolisthesis at L5-S1. (A) CT sagittal view of a low grade slip. (B) Lateral radiograph pre-operative intervention. (C) Surgically treated with L5–S1 decompression, instrumented fusion and placement of an interbody graft between L5 and S1.

Both minimally invasive and open surgical techniques are used to treat anterolisthesis. Surgical options include decompression only, decompression with fusion, and for some cases of low-grade (up to Grade I) spondylolisthesis, motion preservation as an alternative to fusion. For instance, the TOPS System provides stability while allowing for preserved spinal motion, as an alternative to fusion. The Limiflex implant, more recently FDA approved specifically for degenerative spondylolisthesis, also preserves motion as an alternative to fusion and is minimally invasive, used in conjunction with a microsurgical decompression. A 2026 systematic review found that adding fusion to decompression surgery eased back pain and leg pain and improved function about as much as decompression alone.

== Retrolisthesis ==
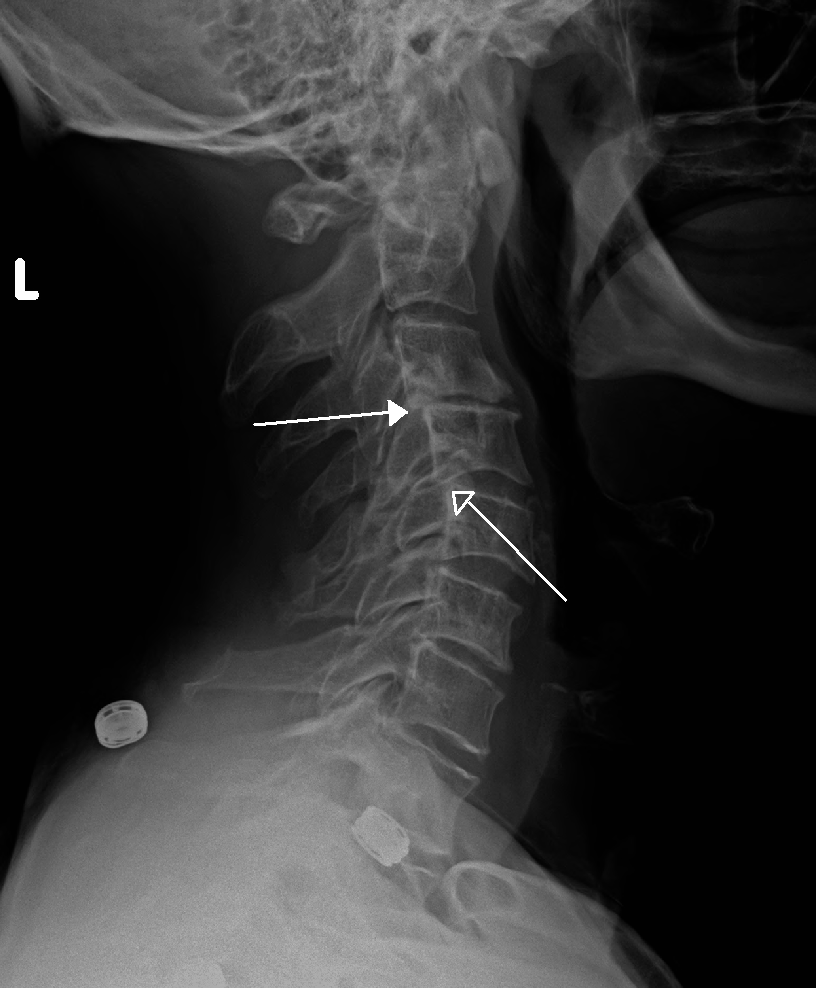
Grade 1 retrolistheses of C3 on C4 and C4 on C5

A retrolisthesis is a posterior displacement of one vertebral body with respect to the subjacent vertebra to a degree less than a luxation (dislocation). Retrolistheses are most easily diagnosed on lateral x-ray views of the spine. Views, where care has been taken to expose for a true lateral view without any rotation, offer the best diagnostic quality.

Retrolistheses are found most prominently in the cervical and lumbar region, but can also be seen in the thoracic area.

== History ==
Spondylolisthesis was first described in 1782 by Belgian obstetrician Herbinaux. He reported a bony prominence anterior to the sacrum that obstructed the vagina of a small number of patients.

The term spondylolisthesis was coined in 1854 from the Greek words spóndylos (σπόνδυλος), which means "spine" or "vertebra," and olísthēsis (ολίσθησις), which means "slipping, sliding or movement".

== See also ==
- Spondylosis
- Spondylolysis (Pars defect or stress fracture)
- Failed back syndrome
- Joint dislocation
