= Meningeal branches of spinal nerve =

Meningeal branches of spinal nerves

Details
- From: Spinal nerve
- Innervates: intraspinal ligaments, vertebral periosteum, anulus fibrosus, zygapophysial joint capsules

Identifiers
- TA98: A14.2.00.032
- TA2: 6148
- FMA: 76729

The meningeal branches of the spinal nerves (also known as recurrent meningeal nerves, sinuvertebral nerves, or recurrent nerves of Luschka) are a number of small nerves that branch from the segmental spinal nerve near the origin of the anterior and posterior rami, but before the rami communicans; rami communicantes are branches which communicate between the spinal nerves and the sympathetic trunk. They then re-enter the intervertebral foramen, and innervate the facet joints, the anulus fibrosus of the intervertebral disc, and the ligaments and periosteum of the spinal canal, carrying pain sensation. The nucleus pulposus of the intervertebral disk has no pain innervation.
