= Superior cluneal nerves =

Sensory nerves of the buttocks

- Cutaneous nerves of the right lower extremity. Front and posterior views. (Posterior division of lumbar visible in yellow at top right.)

Details
- From: dorsal rami of L1-L3 nerve roots
- Innervates: upper buttocks

Identifiers
- Latin: nervi clunium superiores
- TA98: A14.2.05.006
- TA2: 6493
- FMA: 75468

The superior cluneal nerves are pure sensory nerves that innervate the skin of the upper part of the buttocks. They are the terminal ends of the L1-L3 spinal nerve dorsal rami lateral branches. They are one of three different types of cluneal nerves (the middle and inferior cluneal nerves being the other two). They travel inferiorly through multiple layers of muscles, then traverse osteofibrous tunnels between the thoracolumbar fascia and iliac crest.

Dysfunction of the superior cluneal nerves is often due to entrapment as the nerves cross the iliac crest – this can result in numbness, tingling or pain in the low back and upper buttocks region. Superior cluneal nerve dysfunction is a clinical diagnosis that can be supported by diagnostic nerve blocks.

The superior cluneal nerves were first described by Maigne et al. in 1989 as a source of low back pain.

== Anatomy ==
=== Origin ===
These nerves are grouped as the superior cluneal nerves due to their trajectory over the iliac spine, as opposed to the lateral, medial and inferior cluneal nerves. These nerves most commonly originate from the dorsal rami of the L1, L2, and L3 nerve roots. In cadaver studies, a small percentage of patients will also have origins at the L4 and L5 nerve roots.

=== Course and relations ===
After they branch off the dorsal rami, they pass through the erector spinae muscle, psoas major, paraspinal muscles, and then inferior latissimus dorsi to reach the iliac crest.

The nerves then pass through an osteofibrous tunnel created by the thoracolumbar fascia and rim of the superior iliac crest. Cadaver studies have noted that some patients have boney grooves along the rim that house the superior cluneal nerves. On average, these grooves are found between 5–7 cm from the midline. These grooves can often be visualized with an ultrasound.

The nerves terminate over the gluteal fascia distal to the iliac crest.

== Clinical significance ==
Damage to the cluneal nerves can be from direct injury or from entrapment between the muscles or in the osteofibrous tunnel. Direct injury to the cluneal nerves can happen during posterior iliac crest harvest to obtain bone mineral for other surgeries, such as spinal arthrodesis. Entrapment of the nerve can occur at any point but is most common across the osteofibrous tunnel.

=== Superior cluneal nerve dysfunction ===
Dysfunction of the superior cluneal nerves lead to many different neuropathic symptoms such as burning pain, numbness, tingling, and dysesthesia around the low back and upper gluteal area. The most common symptoms are localized unilateral low back pain, though up to anywhere between 40 and 82% of patients may complain of leg symptoms – pain or dysethesia. The onset of pain can vary, with some patients report sudden onset of pain with a known inciting incident. These symptoms can be exacerbated by lumbar flexion, extension, and rotation. Manual compression over the posterior superior iliac crest, such as with wearing tight clothing and belts, can also reproduce symptoms. Many patients also have tender points located around the posterior iliac crest, approximately 7 cm from midline which correlates with cadaver studies demonstrating the location at which the nerves cross the iliac crest. On physical exam, the pain can be reproduced by the excessive motions listed above or by tapping along the posterior superior iliac crest, which would be a positive Tinel-like sign. In the setting of nerve entrapment between the muscles, activation of the muscles with lumbar extension can reproduce the pain. Besides pain, patients can also have reduced sensation to light touch over the nerve distribution.

Diagnosis of superior cluneal nerve dysfunction requires the help of a skilled clinician as it requires a good history and physical examination. Imaging, such as magnetic resonance imaging, can be used to rule out other pathologies. In many cases, this diagnosis is made after treatment of more common pathologies with similar symptoms. The most common overlapping pathologies include facet joint pain, sacroiliac joint dysfunction, and lumbosacral radiculopathy. Electrodiagnostic studies, including electromyography and nerve conduction studies, can also help rule out other pathologies. Currently, there is no consistent protocol for testing the superior cluneal nerves with a nerve conduction study. Diagnosis of superior cluneal nerve entrapment can be aided by diagnostic blocks of the nerve across the iliac crest.

==== Treatment ====
The treatment for superior cluneal nerve dysfunction can vary based on the clinician and severity of symptoms. There is currently limited evidence for treatment at this time. Physical therapy can be initiated to improve strength and flexibility. The addition of non-steroidal anti-inflammatory medications can help with overall discomfort but has not been shown to have direct effects of the nerve. Specifically, the use of COX-2 inhibitors is a reasonable first step. Other treatments of superior cluneal nerve dysfunction include both minimally invasive interventions and surgical options. Minimally invasive treatments include nerve blocks, neuroablation, and neuromodulation. Efficacy of these interventions are still being studied and no clear evidence to show long term benefits in larger studies. Minimally invasive treatments can be performed with ultrasound or fluoroscopy to improve safety and accuracy.

Nerve blocks are injections that target specific nerves to serve as both therapeutic and diagnostic purposes. They have been used for a variety of neuropathic conditions including facet joint pain. Nerve block injections specifically targeted at the superior cluneal nerves are limited. However, these blocks are minimally invasive and involve injecting medications at the nerves as they cross the iliac crest. These blocks can be done with local anesthetics with or without corticosteroids. Improvement in pain after these blocks suggest that these nerves are the source of the patient's symptoms, however these blocks are often temporary and studies regarding corticosteroid reported 68% of patients had improved back pain after 1-3 repetitive blocks. These injections can be performed with or without image modalities, though the use of ultrasound guidance may help optimize medication delivery These procedures can also be done under fluoroscopy.

Neuroablation can be performed with chemical neurolysis or radiofrequency ablation. These techniques are often used on the medial branch nerves to treat low back pain and have been applied to the superior cluneal nerves. The use of phenol has been noted to relieve pain for up to 9 months but may not completely resolve symptoms.

Neuromodulation of the cluneal nerve with peripheral nerve stimulation has not been widely established as an effective treatment, though there are some studies that show significant benefits.

Surgical intervention typically involves decompression of the nerves from the osteofibrous tunnels. Few studies have shown long term benefits of surgical intervention.

== Additional images ==
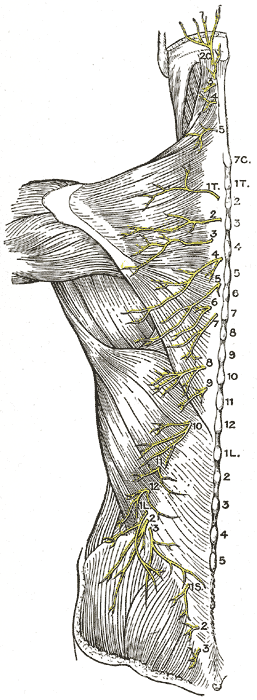
Diagram of the distribution of the cutaneous branches of the posterior divisions of the spinal nerves.

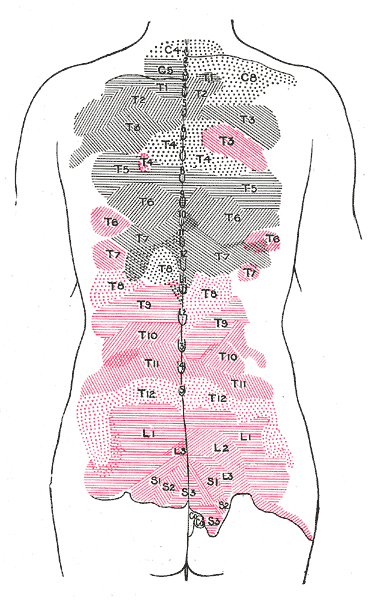
Areas of distribution of the cutaneous branches of the posterior divisions of the spinal nerves.
