= Articular process =

Projections of the vertebra

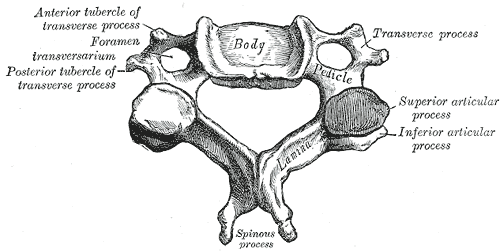
- A cervical vertebra. (Superior and inferior processes labeled at right.)

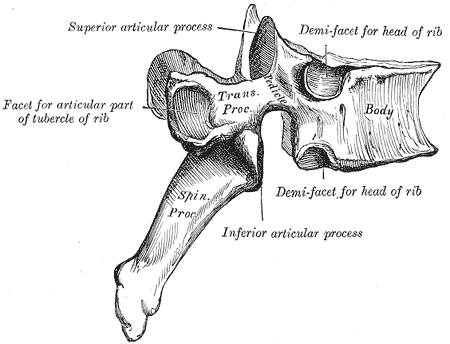
- A thoracic vertebra. (Superior labeled at top; inferior labeled at bottom.)

Details

Identifiers
- Latin: processus articularis inferior vertebrae, processus articularis superior vertebrae
- FMA: 11952

The articular process or zygapophysis (Greek: ζυγόν, romanized: zugón, lit. 'yoke' + apophysis) of a vertebra is a projection of the vertebra that serves the purpose of fitting with an adjacent vertebra. The actual region of contact is called the articular facet.

Articular processes spring from the junctions of the pedicles and laminæ, and there are two right and left, and two superior and inferior. These stick out of an end of a vertebra to lock with a zygapophysis on the next vertebra, to make the backbone more stable.

- The superior processes or prezygapophysis project upward from a lower vertebra, and their articular surfaces are directed more or less backward (oblique coronal plane).
- The inferior processes or postzygapophysis project downward from a higher vertebra, and their articular surfaces are directed more or less forward and outward.

The articular surfaces are coated with hyaline cartilage.

In the cervical vertebral column, the articular processes collectively form the articular pillars. These are the bony surfaces palpated just lateral to the spinous processes.

== Additional images ==
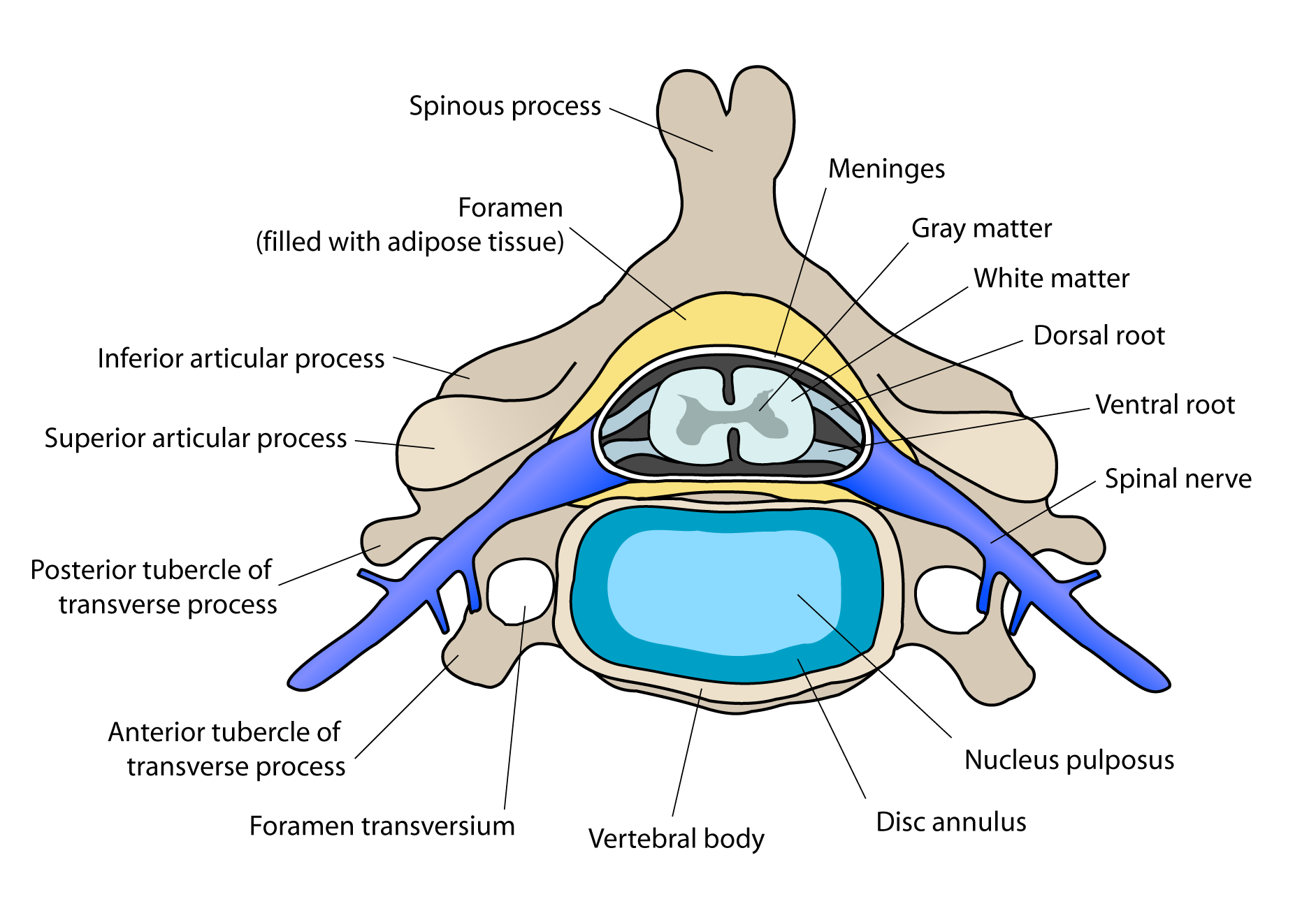
Cervical vertebra

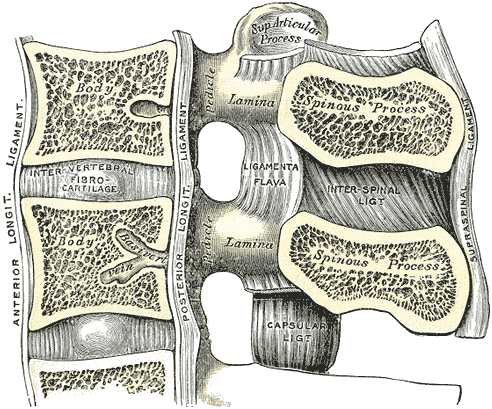
Median sagittal section of two lumbar vertebræ and their ligaments.

== See also ==
- Pars interarticularis
- Zygapophyseal joint
