= Intervertebral foramen =

Foramen between spinal vertebrae

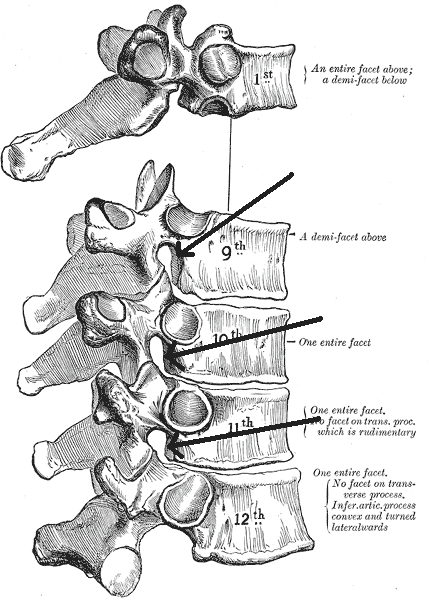
- Peculiar thoracic vertebrae. Intervertebral foramina are indicated by arrows.

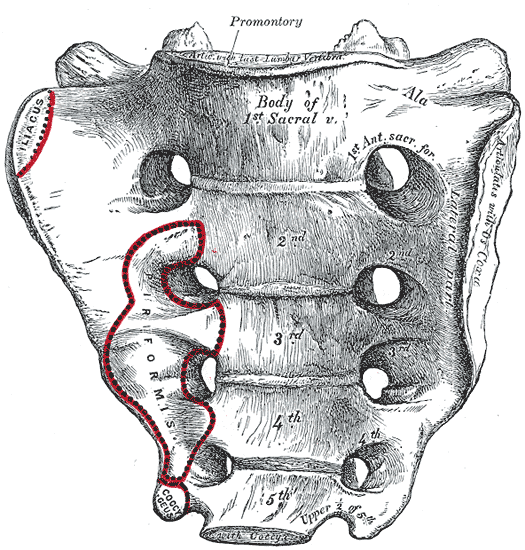
- Sacrum, pelvic surface. (The two columns of four holes are the intervertebral foramina of sacrum, visible but not labeled.)

Details

Identifiers
- Latin: foramen intervertebrale (pl. foramina intervertebralia)
- TA98: A02.2.01.008
- TA2: 1019
- FMA: 75346

The intervertebral foramen (also neural foramen) (often abbreviated as IV foramen or IVF) is an opening between (the intervertebral notches of) two pedicles (one above and one below) of adjacent vertebra in the articulated spine. Each intervertebral foramen gives passage to a spinal nerve and spinal blood vessels, and lodges a posterior (dorsal) root ganglion. Cervical, thoracic, and lumbar vertebrae all have intervertebral foramina.

== Anatomy ==
=== Structure ===
In the thoracic region and lumbar region, each vertebral foramen is additionally bounded anteriorly by (the inferior portion of) the body of vertebra (particularly in the thoracic region) and adjacent intervertebral disc (particularly in the lumbar region).

In the cervical region, a small part of the body of vertebra inferior to the intervertebral disc also forms the anterior boundary of the IVF (due to the fact that the junction of the pedicle with the body of vertebra is situated somewhat more inferiorly on the body).

=== Contents ===
A number of structures pass through the IVF: spinal nerve roots, a recurrent meningeal nerve, radicular arteries (where present), segmental medullary arteries (where present), intervertebral veins, and lymphatic vessels.

The posterior (dorsal) root ganglion is situated within the IVF. The adipose tissue of the spinal epidural space extends into the IVF. The spinal dura mater extends laterally with each departing spinal nerve, reaching into the IVF. Transforaminal ligaments (when present) extend through the IFV.

== Clinical significance ==
Foramina can be occluded by arthritic degenerative changes and space-occupying lesions like tumors, metastases, and spinal disc herniations. The space can be widened with foraminoplasty.

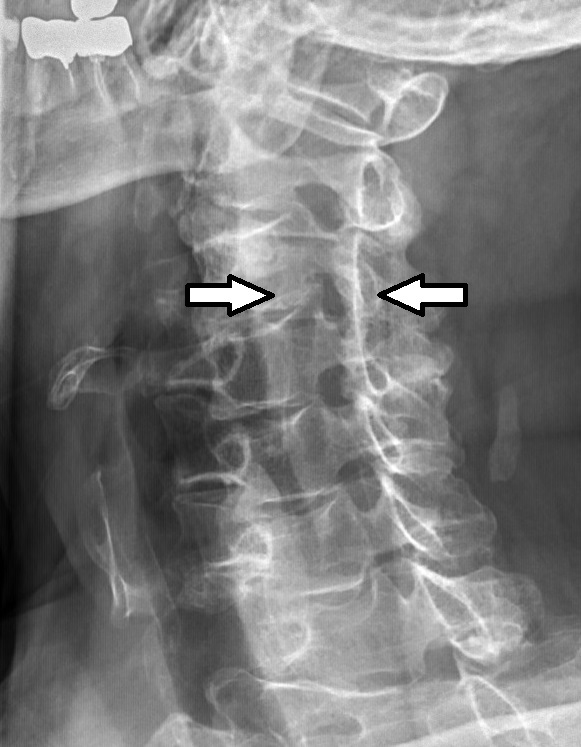
Projectional radiograph of a man presenting with pain by the nape and left shoulder, showing a stenosis of the left intervertebral foramen of cervical spinal nerve 4 due to age-related degenerative changes, corresponding with the affected dermatome
