= Persistent spinal pain syndrome =

Chronic pain following back surgeries

- Specialty: Neurosurgery Orthopaedic surgery

Persistent spinal pain syndrome (PSPS) is a pain disorder characterized by chronic pain originating in the spine. PSPS is categorized into two primary types:

- Type 1 (PSPS-T1): Spinal pain in patients who have not undergone surgery.
- Type 2 (PSPS-T2): Spinal pain following one or more surgeries.

PSPS type 2 replaces the older term failed back surgery syndrome (FBSS), which is now considered medically inadequate and potentially pejorative. While 'post-laminectomy syndrome' is still used by some clinicians, PSPS is the preferred label under ICD-11. Many factors can contribute to the onset or development of FBSS, including residual or recurrent spinal disc herniation, persistent post-operative pressure on a spinal nerve, altered joint mobility, joint hypermobility with instability, scar tissue (fibrosis), depression, anxiety, sleeplessness, spinal muscular deconditioning, and Cutibacterium acnes infection. An individual may be predisposed to the development of FBSS by comorbid systemic diseases, including diabetes, autoimmune diseases, and peripheral vascular disease.

== Signs and symptoms ==
Common symptoms of failed back surgery syndrome include diffuse, dull, and aching pain in the back or legs, often accompanied by abnormal sensations such as sharp, pricking, or stabbing pain in the extremities. Patients may also experience pain at a different level from the location originally treated, along with an inability to fully recuperate and restricted mobility. Sharp, stabbing pain in the back, numbness, muscle spasms, or pain radiating from the lower back into the legs are frequently reported. In addition to physical discomfort, FBSS can lead to psychological symptoms such as anxiety, depression, and insomnia.

== Cause ==
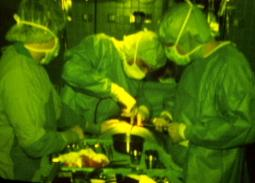
Spinal surgeons operating on a patient's back.

The number of spinal surgeries varies around the world. The United States and the Netherlands report the highest number of spinal surgeries, while the United Kingdom and Sweden report the fewest. Some health systems in Europe have recently reported a trend toward more frequent surgical management. Success rates of spinal surgery vary for many reasons.

Patients who have undergone one or more operations on the lumbar spine and continue to experience pain afterwards can be divided into two groups.

- The first group comprises those in whom surgery was not actually indicated or the surgery performed was not likely to achieve the desired result, and those in whom surgery was indicated but which technically did not achieve the intended result. Patients whose pain complaints are of a sciatic, radicular nature have a better chance for a good outcome than those whose pain complaints are limited to pain in the back.
- The second group includes patients who had incomplete or inadequate operations. Lumbar spinal stenosis may be overlooked, especially when it is associated with disc protrusion or herniation. Removal of a disc, while not addressing the underlying presence of stenosis, can lead to disappointing results. Occasionally operating on the wrong level occurs, as does failure to recognize an extruded or sequestered disc fragment. Inadequate or inappropriate surgical exposure can lead to other problems, including failure to reach the underlying pathology. Hakelius reported a 3% incidence of serious nerve root damage.

In 1992, Turner et al. published a survey of 74 journal articles that reported the results after decompression for spinal stenosis. Good to excellent results were, on average, reported by 64% of the patients. There was, however, a wide variation in outcomes reported. There was a better result in patients who had a degenerative spondylolisthesis. A similarly designed study by Mardjekto et al. found that a concomitant spinal arthrodesis (fusion) had a greater success rate. Herron and Trippi evaluated 24 patients, all with degenerative spondylolisthesis treated with laminectomy alone. At follow-up varying between 18 and 71 months after surgery, 20 out of the 24 patients reported a good result. Epstein reported on 290 patients treated over a 25-year period. Excellent results were obtained in 69%, and good results in 13%. These optimistic reports do not correlate with "return to competitive employment" rates, which for the most part are dismal in most spinal surgery series.

In the past two decades, there has been a dramatic increase in fusion surgery in the U.S.: in 2001, over 122,000 lumbar fusions were performed, a 22% increase from 1990 in fusions per 100,000 population, increasing to an estimate of 250,000 in 2003, and 500,000 in 2006. In 2003, the national bill for the hardware for fusion alone was estimated to have soared to $2.5 billion a year. For patients with continued pain after surgery which is not due to the above complications or conditions, interventional pain physicians speak of the need to identify the "pain generator," i.e., the anatomical structure responsible for the patient's pain. To be effective, the surgeon must operate on the correct anatomic structure, but it is often not possible to determine the source of the pain. The reason for this is that many patients with chronic pain often have disc bulges at multiple spinal levels, and the physical examination and imaging studies are unable to pinpoint the source of pain. In addition, spinal fusion itself, particularly if more than one spinal level is operated on, may result in "adjacent segment degeneration". This is thought to occur because the fused segments may result in increased torsional and stress forces being transmitted to the intervertebral discs located above and below the fused vertebrae. This pathology is one reason behind the development of artificial discs as a possible alternative to fusion surgery. But fusion surgeons argue that spinal fusion is more time-tested, and artificial discs contain metal hardware that is unlikely to last as long as biological material without shattering and leaving metal fragments in the spinal canal. These represent different schools of thought. (See discussion on disc replacement infra.)

Another highly relevant consideration is the increasing recognition of the importance of "chemical radiculitis" in the generation of back pain. A primary focus of surgery is to remove "pressure" or reduce mechanical compression on a neural element: either the spinal cord, or a nerve root. But it is increasingly recognized that back pain, rather than being solely due to compression, may instead entirely be due to chemical inflammation of the nerve root. It has been known for several decades that disc herniations result in a massive inflammation of the associated nerve root. In the past five years increasing evidence has pointed to a specific inflammatory mediator of this pain. This inflammatory molecule, called tumor necrosis factor-alpha (TNF), is released not only by the herniated or protruding disc, but also in cases of disc tear (annular tear), by facet joints, and in spinal stenosis. In addition to causing pain and inflammation, TNF may also contribute to disc degeneration. If the cause of the pain is not compression, but rather is inflammation mediated by TNF, then this may well explain why surgery might not relieve the pain, and might even exacerbate it, resulting in FBS.

=== Role of sacroiliac joint (SIJ) in lower back pain (LBP) ===
A 2005 review by Cohen concluded, 'The SI joint is a real yet underappreciated pain generator in an estimated 15% to 25% of patients with axial LBP'. Studies by Ha et al. show that the incidence of SI joint degeneration in post-lumbar fusion surgery is 75% at 5 years post-surgery, based on imaging. Studies by DePalma and Liliang, et al., demonstrate that 40–61% of post-lumbar fusion patients were symptomatic for SI joint dysfunction based on diagnostic blocks.

=== Smoking ===
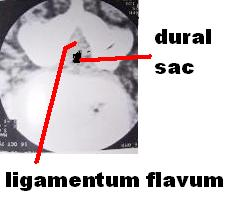
CT scan showing markedly thickened ligamentum flavum (yellow ligament) causing spinal stenosis in the lumbar spine.

Recent studies have shown that cigarette smokers will routinely fail all spinal surgery, if the goal of that surgery is the decrease of pain and impairment. Many surgeons consider smoking to be an absolute contraindication to spinal surgery. Nicotine appears to interfere with bone metabolism through induced calcitonin resistance and decreased osteoblastic function. It may also restrict small blood vessel diameter, leading to increased scar formation.

There is an association between cigarette smoking, back pain, and chronic pain syndromes of all types.

In a report of 426 spinal surgery patients in Denmark, smoking was shown to have a negative effect on fusion and overall patient satisfaction, but no measurable influence on the functional outcome.

There is a validation of the hypothetical assumption that postoperative smoking cessation helps to reverse the impact of cigarette smoking on outcome after spinal fusion. If patients cease cigarette smoking in the immediate postoperative period, there is a positive impact on success.

Regular smoking in adolescence was associated with low back pain in young adults. Pack-years of smoking showed an exposure-response relationship among girls.

A recent study suggested that cigarette smoking adversely affects serum hydrocodone levels. Prescribing physicians should be aware that in some cigarette smokers, serum hydrocodone levels might not be detectable.

In a study from Denmark reviewing many reports in the literature, it was concluded that smoking should be considered a weak risk indicator and not a cause of low back pain. In a multitude of epidemiologic studies, an association between smoking and low back pain has been reported, but variations in approach and study results make this literature difficult to reconcile. In a study of 3482 patients undergoing lumbar spine surgery from the National Spine Network, co-morbidities of (1) smoking, (2) compensation, (3) self reported poor overall health and (4) pre-existing psychological factors were predictive in a high risk of failure. Follow-up was performed at 3 months and 1 year after surgery. Pre-operative depressive disorders tended not to do well.

Smoking has been shown to increase the incidence of postoperative infection as well as decrease fusion rates. One study showed that 90% of postoperative infections occurred in smokers, as well as myonecrosis (muscle destruction) around the wound.

== Pathology ==
Before the advent of CT scanning, the pathology in failed back surgery syndrome was difficult to understand. CT in conjunction with metrizamide myelography in the late 1960s and 1970s allowed direct observation of the mechanisms involved in postoperative failures. Six distinct pathological conditions were identified:

- Recurrent or persistent disc herniation
- Spinal stenosis
- Postoperative infection
- Epidural postoperative fibrosis
- Adhesive arachnoiditis
- Nerve injury

=== Recurrent or persistent disc herniation ===
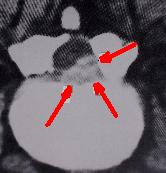
CT scan image of large herniated disc in the lumbar spine.

Removal of a disc at one level can lead to disc herniation at a different level at a later time. Even the most complete resection of the disc still leaves 30–40% of the disc, which cannot be safely removed. This retained disc material can re-herniate sometime after surgery. Virtually every major structure in the abdomen and the posterior retroperitoneal space has been injured, at some point, by removing discs using posterior laminectomy/discectomy surgical procedures. The most prominent of these is a laceration of the left internal iliac vein, which lies in close proximity to the anterior portion of the disc. In an early study, recurrent pain in the same or another radicular pattern was as high as 50% after disc surgery. The most common cause of failed back surgery syndrome is recurrent disc herniation at the same level originally operated upon; a rapid removal in a second surgery can be curative. The clinical picture of a recurrent disc herniation usually involves a significant pain-free interval. However, physical findings may be lacking, and a good history is necessary. The time period for the emergence of new symptoms can be short or long. Diagnostic signs such as the straight leg raise test may be negative even if real pathology is present. The presence of a positive myelogram may represent a new disc herniation, but can also be indicative of a postoperative scarring situation simply mimicking a new disc. Newer MRI imaging techniques have clarified this dilemma somewhat. Conversely, a recurrent disc can be difficult to detect in the presence of post op scarring. Myelography is inadequate to completely evaluate the patient for recurrent disc disease, and a CT scan or MRI is necessary. Measurement of tissue density can be helpful.

Even though the complications of laminectomy for disc herniation can be significant, a 2008 study involving thousands of patients published under auspices of Dartmouth Medical School concluded at four-year follow-up that those who underwent surgery for a lumbar disc herniation achieved greater improvement than nonoperatively treated patients in all primary and secondary outcomes except work status.

=== Spinal stenosis ===
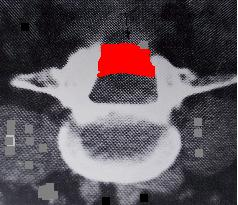
CT scan of laminectomy showing scar formation (highlighted in red)causing new stenosis.

Spinal stenosis can be a late complication after laminectomy for disc herniation or when surgery was performed for the primary pathological condition of spinal stenosis. In the Maine Study, among patients with lumbar spinal stenosis completing 8- to 10-year follow-up, low back pain relief, predominant symptom improvement, and satisfaction with their current state were similar in patients initially treated surgically or non-surgically. However, leg pain relief and greater back-related functional status continued to favor those initially receiving surgical treatment.

A large study of spinal stenosis from Finland found the prognostic factors for the ability to work after surgery were the ability to work before surgery, age under 50 years, and no prior back surgery. The very long-term outcome (mean follow-up time of 12.4 years) was excellent-to-good in 68% of patients (59% of women and 73% of men). Furthermore, in the longitudinal follow-up, the result improved between 1985 and 1991. No special complications were manifested during this very long-term follow-up time. The patients with total or subtotal block in preoperative myelography achieved the best result. Furthermore, patients with block stenosis showed significant improvement in their results during longitudinal follow-up. The postoperative stenosis seen on CT scans was observed in 65% of 90 patients, and it was severe in 23 patients (25%). However, this successful or unsuccessful surgical decompression did not correlate with patients' subjective disability, walking capacity, or severity of pain. Previous back surgery had a strong worsening effect on surgical results. This effect was very clear in patients with a total preoperative myelographic block. The surgical result of a patient with previous back surgery was similar to that of a patient without previous back surgery when the time interval between the last two operations was more than 18 months.

Postoperative MRI findings of stenosis are probably of limited value compared to symptoms experienced by patients. Patients' perception of improvement showed a much stronger correlation with long-term surgical outcome than did structural findings on postoperative MRI. Degenerative findings had a greater effect on patients' walking capacity than stenotic findings.

Postoperative radiologic stenosis was very common in patients operated on for lumbar spinal stenosis, but this did not correlate with clinical endpoints. The clinician must be cautious when reconciling clinical symptoms and signs with postoperative CT findings in patients operated on for lumbar spinal stenosis.

A study from Georgetown University reported on one-hundred patients who had undergone decompressive surgery for lumbar stenosis between 1980 and 1985. Four patients with post-fusion stenosis were included. A 5-year follow-up period was achieved in 88 patients. The mean age was 67 years, and 80% were over 60 years of age. There was a high incidence of coexisting medical diseases, but the principal disability was lumbar stenosis with neurological involvement. Initially, there was a high incidence of success, but recurrence of neurological involvement and persistence of low-back pain led to an increasing number of failures. By 5 years, this number had reached 27% of the available population, suggesting that the failure rate could reach 50% within the projected life expectancies of most patients. Of the 26 failures, 16 were secondary to renewed neurological involvement, which occurred at new levels of stenosis in eight and at operative levels in eight. Reoperation was successful in 12 of these 16 patients, but two required a third operation. The incidence of spondylolisthesis at 5 years was higher in the surgical failures (12 of 26 patients) than in the surgical successes (16 of 64). Spondylolisthetic stenosis tended to recur within a few years following decompression. Because of age and associated illnesses, fusion may be difficult to achieve in this group.

=== Postoperative infection ===
A small minority of lumbar surgical patients will develop a postoperative infection. In most cases, this is a bad complication and does not bode well for eventual improvement or future employability. Reports from the surgical literature indicate an infection rate anywhere from 0% to almost 12%. The incidence of infection tends to increase as the complexity of the procedure and operating time increase. Usage of metal implants (instrumentation) tends to increase the risk of infection. Factors associated with an increased infection include diabetes mellitus, obesity, malnutrition, smoking, previous infection, rheumatoid arthritis, and immunodeficiency. Previous wound infection should be considered as a contraindication to any further spinal surgery, since the likelihood of improving such patients with more surgery is small. Antimicrobial prophylaxis reduces surgical site infections in lumbar spine surgery, but its use varies. A Japanese study using CDC guidelines found an infection rate of 0.7%, with 0.4% in the single-dose group and 0.8% in the multiple-dose group. They previously used antibiotics for 5–7 days, but after adopting the CDC guideline for surgery-day prophylaxis, no significant difference in infection rates was found. A single dose was effective in preventing lumbar surgical infections.

=== Epidural postoperative fibrosis ===
Epidural scarring following a laminectomy for disc excision is a common feature when re-operating for recurrent sciatica or radiculopathy. When the scarring is associated with a spinal disc herniation or recurrent spinal stenosis, it is relatively common, occurring in more than 60% of cases. For a time, it was theorized that placing a fat graft over the dura mater could prevent postoperative scarring. However, initial enthusiasm waned. In an extensive laminectomy involving 2 or more vertebra, postoperative scarring is the norm. It is most often seen around the L5 and S1 nerve roots.

=== Adhesive arachnoiditis ===
Myelogram showing typical findings of arachnoiditis in the lumbar spine.

Fibrous scarring can also be a complication within the subarachnoid space. It is notoriously difficult to detect and evaluate. Prior to the development of magnetic resonance imaging, the only way to ascertain the presence of arachnoiditis was by opening the dura. In the days of CT scanning, Pantopaque, and later metrizamide myelography, the presence of arachnoiditis could be speculated based on radiographic findings. Often, myelography prior to the introduction of metrizamide was the cause of arachnoiditis. It can also be caused by the long-term pressure brought about by either a severe disc herniation or spinal stenosis. The presence of both epidural scarring and arachnoiditis in the same patient are probably quite common. Arachnoiditis is a broad term denoting inflammation of the meninges and subarachnoid space. A variety of causes exist, including infectious, inflammatory, and neoplastic processes. Infectious causes include bacterial, viral, fungal, and parasitic agents. Non-infectious inflammatory processes include surgery, intrathecal hemorrhage, and the administration of intrathecal (inside the dural canal) agents such as myelographic contrast media, anesthetics (e.g., chloroprocaine), and steroids (e.g., Depo-Medrol and Kenalog). Lately, iatrogenic arachnoiditis has been attributed to misplaced therapeutic epidural steroid injection when accidentally administered intrathecally. The preservatives and suspension agents found in all steroid injectates, which aren't indicated for epidural administration by the Food and Drug Administration (FDA) due to reports of severe adverse events including arachnoiditis, paralysis and death, have now been directly linked to the onset of the disease following the initial stage of chemical meningitis.

Neoplasia includes the hematogenous spread of systemic tumors, such as breast and lung carcinoma, melanoma, and non-Hodgkin lymphoma. Neoplasia also includes direct seeding of the cerebrospinal fluid (CSF) from primary central nervous system (CNS) tumors such as glioblastoma multiforme, medulloblastoma, ependymoma, and choroid plexus carcinoma. Strictly speaking, the most common cause of arachnoiditis in failed back surgery syndrome is not infectious or from cancer. It is due to non-specific scarring secondary to the surgery or the underlying pathology.

=== Nerve injury ===
Laceration of a nerve root, or damage from cautery or traction can lead to chronic pain, however this can be difficult to determine. Chronic compression of the nerve root by a persistent agent such as disc, bone (osteophyte), or scarring can also permanently damage the nerve root. Epidural scarring caused by the initial pathology or occurring after the surgery can also contribute to nerve damage. In one study of failed back patients, the presence of pathology was noted to be at the same site as the level of surgery performed in 57% of cases. The remaining cases developed pathology at a different level, or on the opposite side, but at the same level as the surgery was performed. In theory, all failed back patients have some nerve injury or damage which leads to a persistence of symptoms after a reasonable healing time.

== Diagnosis ==
Diagnosis is done with a physical exam, oral history, followed by medial imaging such as MRI. If the patient has ferromagnetic implants, then a CT exam is done instead. Specialized tests, such as blood work and specific nerve tests, may be used if necessary. X-rays are also often conducted, since they are inexpensive and simple.

== Management/Treatment ==
Failed back surgery syndrome is a well-recognized complication of surgery of the lumbar spine. It can result in chronic pain and disability, often with disastrous emotional and financial consequences to the patient. Many patients have traditionally been classified as "spinal cripples" and are consigned to a life of long-term narcotic treatment with little chance of recovery. Despite extensive work in recent years, FBSS remains a challenging and costly disorder.

The treatments of post-laminectomy syndrome include physical therapy, microcurrent electrical neuromuscular stimulator, minor nerve blocks, transcutaneous electrical nerve stimulation, behavioral medicine, non-steroidal anti-inflammatory medications, membrane stabilizers, antidepressants, spinal cord stimulation, and intrathecal morphine pump. Use of epidural steroid injections may be minimally helpful in some cases. The targeted anatomic use of a potent anti-inflammatory anti-TNF therapeutics is being investigated.

=== Opioids ===
A study of chronic pain patients from the University of Wisconsin found that methadone is most widely known for its use in the treatment of opioid dependence, but methadone also provides effective analgesia. Patients who experience inadequate pain relief or intolerable side effects with other opioids or who are diagnosed with neuropathic pain may benefit from a transition to methadone as their analgesic agent. Adverse effects, particularly respiratory depression and death, make a fundamental knowledge of methadone's pharmacological properties essential to the provider considering methadone as analgesic therapy for a patient with chronic pain.

=== Patient selection ===
Patients who have sciatic pain (pain in the back, radiating down the buttock to the leg) and clear clinical findings of an identifiable radicular nerve loss caused by a herniated disc will have a better postoperative course than those who have low back pain. If a specific disc herniation causing pressure on a nerve root cannot be identified, the results of surgery are likely to be disappointing. Patients involved in workers' compensation, tort litigation, or other compensation systems tend to fare more poorly after surgery. Surgery for spinal stenosis usually has a good outcome if the surgery is done in an extensive manner and is done within the first year or so of the appearance of symptoms.

Oaklander and North define failed back surgery syndrome as chronic pain after one or more surgical procedures to the spine. They delineated these characteristics of the relation between the patient and the surgeon:

1. The patient makes increasing demands on the surgeon for pain relief. The surgeon may feel a strong responsibility to provide a remedy when the surgery has not achieved the desired goals.
2. The patient grows increasingly angry at the failure and may become litigious.
3. There is an escalation of opioid analgesics which can be habituating or addictive.
4. In the face of expensive conservative treatments, which are likely to fail, the surgeon is persuaded to attempt further surgery, even though this is likely to fail as well.
5. The probability of returning to gainful employment decreases with increasing length of disability.
6. The financial incentives to remain disabled may be perceived as outweighing the incentive to recover.

In the absence of a financial source for disability or workers' compensation, other psychological features may limit the ability of the patient to recover from surgery. Some patients are unfortunate and fall into the category of "chronic pain" despite their desire to recover and the best efforts of the physicians involved in their care. Even less invasive forms of surgery are not uniformly successful; approximately 30,000-40,000 laminectomy patients obtain either no relief of symptomatology or a recurrence of symptoms. Another less invasive form of spinal surgery, percutaneous disc surgery, has reported revision rates as high as 65%. It is no surprise, therefore, that FBS is a significant medical concern which merits further research and attention by the medical and surgical communities.

=== Total disc replacement ===
Lumbar total disc replacement was originally designed to be an alternative to lumbar arthrodesis (fusion). The procedure was met with great excitement and heightened expectations both in the United States and Europe. In late 2004, the first lumbar total disc replacement received approval from the U.S. Food and Drug Administration. More experience existed in Europe. Since then, the initial excitement has given way to skepticism and concern. Various failure rates and strategies for revision of total disc replacement have been reported.

The role of artificial or total disc replacement in the treatment of spinal disorders remains ill-defined and unclear. Evaluation of any new technique is difficult or impossible because physician experience may be minimal or lacking. Patient expectations may be distorted. It has been difficult to establish clear cut indications for artificial disc replacement. It may not be a replacement procedure or an alternative to fusion, since recent studies have shown that 100% of fusion patients had at least one contraindication to disc replacement. The role of disc replacement must come from new indications not defined in today's literature or a relaxation of current contraindications.

A study by Regan found that the results of replacement were the same at L4-5 and L5-S1 with the CHARITE disc. However, the ProDisc II showed more favorable results at L4-5 than at L5-S1.

Younger age was predictive of better outcomes in several studies. In others it has been found to be a negative predictor or of no predictive value. Older patients may have more complications.

Prior spinal surgery has mixed effects on disc replacement. It has been reported to be negative in several studies. It has been reported to have no effect in other studies. Many studies are simply inconclusive. Existing evidence does not allow drawing definite conclusions about the status of disc replacement at present.

=== Electrical stimulation ===
Many failed back surgery syndrome patients are significantly impaired by chronic pain in the back and legs. Many of these will be treated with some form of electrical stimulation. This can be either a transcutaneous electrical nerve stimulation device placed on the skin over the back, or a nerve stimulator implanted into the back with electrical probes that directly contact the spinal cord. Also, some chronic pain patients utilize fentanyl or narcotic patches. These patients are generally severely impaired, and it is unrealistic to conclude that application of neurostimulation will reduce that impairment. For example, it is doubtful that neurostimulation will improve the patient enough to return to competitive employment. Neurostimulation is palliative. Transcutaneous electrical nerve stimulator units work by blocking neurotransmission as described by the pain theory of Melzack and Wall. Success rates for implanted neurostimulation has been reported to be 25% to 55%. Success is defined as a relative decrease in pain.

=== Chiropractic ===
Limited case series have shown improvement for patients with failed back surgery who were managed with chiropractic care.

=== Alternate procedures ===
Smaller procedures that do not remove bone (such as endoscopic transforaminal lumbar discectomy and reconfiguration) do not cause post laminectomy/laminotomy syndrome.

== Prognosis ==
Under rules promulgated by Titles II and XVI of the United States Social Security Act, chronic radiculopathy, arachnoiditis and spinal stenosis are recognized as disabling conditions under Listing 1.04 A (radiculopathy), 1.04 B (arachnoiditis) and 1.04 C (spinal stenosis).

=== Return to work ===
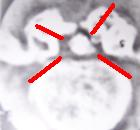
CT scan showing post operative scarring and arachnoiditis.

In a groundbreaking Canadian study, Waddell et al. reported on the value of repeat surgery and the return to work in worker's compensation cases. They concluded that workers who undergo spinal surgery take longer to return to their jobs. Once two spinal surgeries are performed, few if any ever return to gainful employment of any kind. After two spinal surgeries, most people in the worker's comp system will not be made better by more surgery. Most will be worse after a third surgery.

Episodes of back pain associated with on the job injuries in the worker's compensation setting are usually of short duration. About 10% of such episodes will not be simple, and will degenerate into chronic and disabling back pain conditions, even if surgery is not performed.

It has been hypothesized that job dissatisfaction and individual perception of physical demands are associated with an increased time of recovery or an increased risk of no recovery at all. Individual psychological and social work factors, as well as worker-employer relations are also likely to be associated with time and rates of recovery.

A Finnish study of return to work in patients with spinal stenosis treated by surgery found that:

1. None of the patients who had retired before the operation returned to work afterward.
2. The variables that predicted postoperative ability to work for women were: being fit to work at the time of operation, age < 50 years at the time of operation, and duration of lumbar spinal stenosis symptoms < 2 years.
3. For men, these variables were: being fit to work at the time of operation, age < 50 years at the time of operation, no prior surgery, and the extent of the surgical procedure equal to or less than one laminectomy.

In fact, women's and men's working capacity do not differ after lumbar spinal stenosis operation. If the aim is to maximize working capacity, then, when a lumbar spinal stenosis operation is indicated, it should be performed without delay. In lumbar spinal stenosis patients who are older than 50 years old and on sick leave, it is unrealistic to expect that they will return to work. Therefore, after such an extensive surgical procedure, re-education of patients for lighter jobs could improve the chances of these patients returning to work.

In a related Finnish study, a total of 439 patients operated on for lumbar spinal stenosis during the period 1974–1987 was re-examined and evaluated for working and functional capacity approximately 4 years after the decompressive surgery. The ability to work before or after the operation and a history of no prior back surgery were variables predictive of a good outcome. Before the operation 86 patients were working, 223 patients were on sick leave, and 130 patients were retired. After the operation 52 of the employed patients and 70 of the unemployed patients returned to work. None of the retired patients returned to work. Ability to work preoperatively, age under 50 years at the time of operation and the absence of prior back surgery predicted a postoperative ability to work.

A report from Belgium noted that patients reportedly return to work an average of 12 to 16 weeks after surgery for lumbar disc herniation. However, there are studies that lend credence to the value of an earlier stimulation for return to work and performance of normal activities after a limited discectomy. At follow-up assessment, it was found that no patient had changed employment because of back or leg pain. The sooner the recommendation is made to return to work and perform normal activities, the more likely the patient is to comply. Patients with ongoing disabling back conditions have a low priority for return to work. The probability of return to work decreases as time off work increases. This is especially true in Belgium, where 20% of individuals did not resume work activities after surgery for a disc herniation of the lumbar spine.

In Belgium, the medical advisers of sickness funds have an important role legally in the assessment of working capacity and medical rehabilitation measures for employees whose fitness for work is jeopardized or diminished for health reasons. The measures are laid down in the sickness and invalidity legislation. They are in accordance with the principle of preventing long-term disability. It is apparent from the authors' experience that these measures are not adapted consistently in medical practice. Most of the medical advisers are focusing purely on evaluation of corporal damage, leaving little or no time for rehabilitation efforts. In many other countries, the evaluation of work capacity is done by social security doctors with a comparable task.

In a comprehensive set of studies carried out by the University of Washington School of Medicine, it was determined that the outcome of lumbar fusion performed on injured workers was worse than reported in most published case series. They found 68% of lumbar fusion patients still unable to return to work two years after surgery. This was in stark contrast to reports of 68% post-op satisfaction in many series. In a follow-up study it was found that the use of intervertebral fusion devices rose rapidly after their introduction in 1996. This increase in metal usage was associated with a greater risk of complication without improving disability or re-operation rates.

== Research ==
The identification of tumor necrosis factor-alpha as a central cause of inflammatory spinal pain now suggests the possibility of an entirely new approach to selected patients with FBS. Specific and potent inhibitors of TNF became available in the U.S. in 1998, and were demonstrated to be potentially effective for treating sciatica in experimental models beginning in 2001. Targeted anatomic administration of one of these anti-TNF agents, etanercept, a patented treatment method, has been suggested in published pilot studies to be effective for treating selected patients with chronic disc-related pain and FBS. The scientific basis for pain relief in these patients is supported by the many current review articles. In the future new imaging methods may allow non-invasive identification of sites of neuronal inflammation, thereby enabling more accurate localization of the pain generators responsible for symptom production. These treatments are still experimental.

If chronic pain in FBS has a chemical component producing inflammatory pain, then prior to additional surgery it may make sense to use an anti-inflammatory approach. Often this is first attempted with non-steroidal anti-inflammatory medications, but the long-term use of non-steroidal anti-inflammatory drugs for patients with persistent back pain is complicated by their possible cardiovascular and gastrointestinal toxicity; and NSAIDs have limited value to intervene in TNF-mediated processes. An alternative often employed is the injection of cortisone into the spine adjacent to the suspected pain generator, a technique known as epidural steroid injection. Although this technique began more than a decade ago for FBS, the efficacy of epidural steroid injections is now generally thought to be limited to short term pain relief in selected patients only. In addition, epidural steroid injections, in certain settings, may result in serious complications. Fortunately, there are now emerging new methods that directly target TNF. These TNF-targeted methods represent a highly promising new approach for patients with chronic severe spinal pain, such as those with FBS. Ancillary approaches, such as rehabilitation, physical therapy, anti-depressants, and, in particular, graduated exercise programs, may all be useful adjuncts to anti-inflammatory approaches. In addition, more invasive modalities, such as spinal cord stimulation, may offer relief for certain patients with FBS, but these modalities, although often referred to as "minimally invasive", require additional surgery, and have complications of their own.

=== Worldwide perspective ===
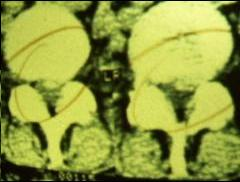
CT scan showing two views of L4-5 disc herniation.

A report from Spain noted that the investigation and development of new techniques for instrumented surgery of the spine is not free from conflicts of interest. The influence of financial forces in the development of new technologies and its immediate application to spine surgery shows the relationship between the published results and the industry support. Authors who have developed and defended fusion techniques have also published new articles praising new spinal technologies. The author calls spinal surgery the "American Stock and Exchange" and "the bubble of spine surgery". The scientific literature doesn't show clear evidence in the cost-benefit studies of most instrumented surgical interventions of the spine compared with the conservative treatments. It has not been yet demonstrated that fusion surgery and disc replacement are better options than conservative treatment. It is necessary to point out that at present "there are relationships between the industry and back pain, and there is also an industry of the back pain".

Nonetheless, the "market of the spine surgery" is growing because patients are demanding solutions for their back problems. The tide of scientific evidence seems to go against the spinal fusions in the degenerative disc disease, discogenic pain and in specific back pain. After decades of advances in this field, the results of spinal fusions are mediocre. New epidemiological studies show that "spinal fusion must be accepted as a non proved or experimental method for the treatment of back pain". The surgical literature on spinal fusion published in the last 20 years establishes that instrumentation seems to slightly increase the fusion rate and that instrumentation doesn't improve the clinical results in general. We still are in need of randomized studies to compare the surgical results with the natural history of the disease, the placebo effect, or conservative treatment. The European guidelines for lumbar chronic pain management show "strong evidence" indicating that complex and demanding spine surgery where different instrumentation is used, is not more effective than a simple, safer and cheaper posterolateral fusion without instrumentation. Recently, the literature published in this field is sending a message to use "minimally invasive techniques" and abandon transpedicular fusions. Surgery in general, and usage of metal fixation should be discarded in most cases.

In Sweden, the national registry of lumbar spine surgery reported in the year 2000 that 15% of patients with spinal stenosis surgery underwent a concomitant fusion. Despite the traditionally conservative approach to spinal surgery in Sweden, there have been calls for a more aggressive approach to lumbar procedures in recent years.

Finally, Cherkin et al. evaluated worldwide surgical attitudes. There were twice the number of surgeons per capita in the United States compared to the United Kingdom. Numbers were similar to Sweden. Despite having very few spinal surgeons, the Netherlands proved to be quite aggressive in surgery. Sweden, despite having a large number of surgeons, was conservative and produced relatively few surgeries. The most surgeries were done in the United States. In the UK, more than a third of non-urgent patients waited over a year to see a spinal surgeon. In Wales, more than half waited over three months for consult. Lower rates of referrals in the United Kingdom was found to discourage surgery in general. Fee for service and easy access to care was thought to encourage spinal surgery in the United States, whereas salaried position and a conservative philosophy led to less surgery in the United Kingdom. There were more spinal surgeons in Sweden than in the United States. However, it was speculated that the Swedish surgeons being limited to compensation of 40–48 hours a week might lead to a conservative philosophy. There have been calls for a more aggressive approach to lumbar surgery in both the United Kingdom and Sweden in recent years.
