= Disc herniation =

Injury to the intervertebral disc

- Other names: Slipped disc, bulging disc, ruptured disc, herniated disc, prolapsed disc, herniated nucleus pulposus, lumbar disc herniation
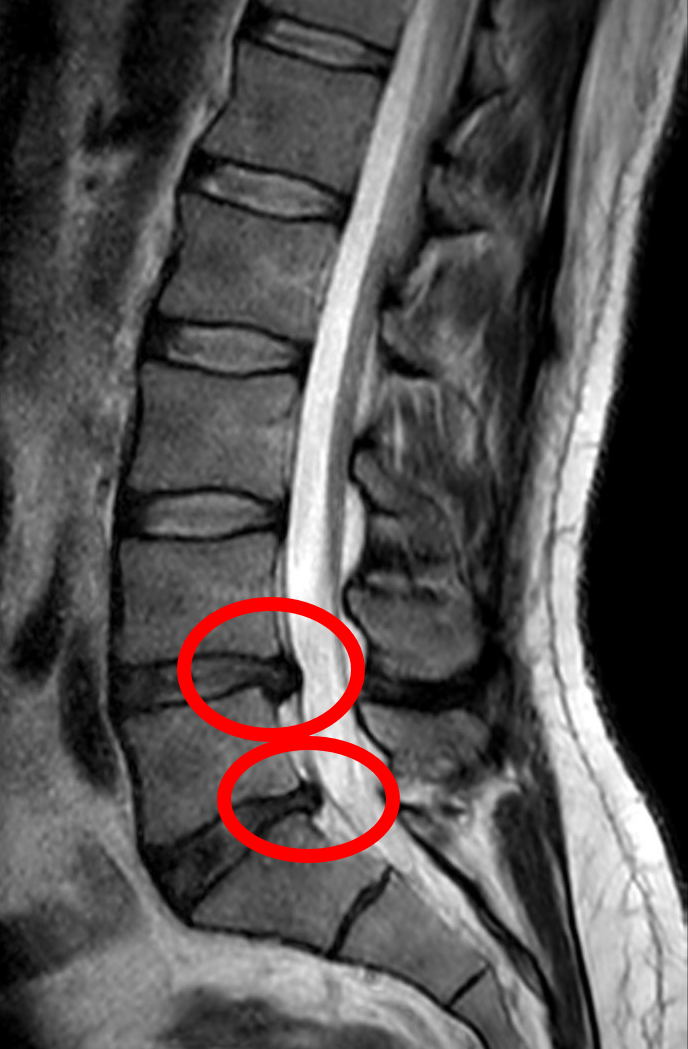
- Specialty: Orthopedics, neurosurgery
- Risk factors: Connective tissue disease

A disc herniation, also known as a spinal disc herniation, is a condition affecting the intervertebral disc between two vertebrae, usually caused by excessive strain or trauma to the spine. It may result in back pain, pain or abnormal sensation in different parts of the body, and physical disability. The most conclusive diagnostic tool for disc herniation is MRI, and treatments may range from painkillers to surgery. The risk of disc herniation may be reduced by maintaining core strength and an awareness of body mechanics including good posture.

When a tear in the outer fibrous ring of an intervertebral disc allows the soft, central portion to bulge out beyond the damaged outer ring, the disc is said to be herniated.

Disc herniation is frequently associated with age-related degeneration of the outer ring, known as the annulus fibrosus, but is normally triggered by trauma or straining from lifting or twisting. Tears are almost always posterolateral (on the back sides) owing to relative narrowness of the posterior longitudinal ligament relative to the anterior longitudinal ligament. A tear in the disc ring may result in the release of chemicals causing inflammation, which can result in severe pain even in the absence of nerve root compression.

Disc herniation may develop from a pre-existing disc protrusion, in which the outermost layers of the annulus fibrosus are still intact, but can bulge when the disc is under pressure. In contrast to a herniation, none of the central portion escapes beyond the outer layers. Most minor herniations heal within several weeks. Anti-inflammatory treatments for pain associated with disc herniation, protrusion, bulge, or disc tear are generally effective. Severe herniations may not heal of their own accord and may require surgery.

The condition may be referred to as a slipped disc, but this term is considered inaccurate as the spinal discs are firmly attached between the vertebrae and cannot "slip" out of place.

== Signs and symptoms ==
Symptoms of a herniated disc can vary depending on the location of the herniation. Symptoms may include pain in the lower back or neck.

It is possible to have a herniated disc without pain or noticeable symptoms if the extruded nucleus pulposus material does not press on soft tissues or nerves. A small-sample study examining the cervical spine in symptom-free volunteers found focal disc protrusions in 50% of participants, suggesting that a considerable part of the population might have focal herniated discs in their cervical region that do not cause noticeable symptoms.

A herniated disc in the lumbar spine may cause radicular pain (radiating nerve pain in the lower extremities or groin area) and may sometimes be associated with bowel or bladder incontinence.

Typically, symptoms are experienced only on one side of the body, but if a herniation is very large and presses on the nerves on both sides within the spinal column or the cauda equina, both sides of the body may be affected, often with serious consequences. Compression of the cauda equina can cause permanent nerve damage (or paralysis if left untreated) which can result in loss of bowel and bladder control and sexual dysfunction. This disorder is called cauda equina syndrome. Other complications include chronic pain.

== Cause ==
When the spine is straight, such as when standing or lying down, internal pressure is equalized on all parts of the discs. While sitting or bending to lift, internal pressure on a disc can move from 1.2 bar (17 psi) (lying down) to over 21 bar (300 psi) (lifting with a rounded back). Herniation of the contents of the disc into the spinal canal often occurs when the anterior side (stomach side) of the disc is compressed while sitting or bending forward, and the contents (nucleus pulposus) get pressed against the tightly stretched and thinned membrane (annulus fibrosus) on the posterior side (back side) of the disc. The combination of membrane-thinning from stretching and increased internal pressure (14 to 21 bar (200 to 300 psi)) can result in the rupture of the confining membrane. The jelly-like contents of the disc then move into the spinal canal, pressing against the spinal nerves, which may produce intense and potentially disabling pain and other symptoms.

Some authors favour degeneration of the intervertebral disc as the major cause of spinal disc herniation and cite trauma as a minor cause. Disc degeneration occurs both in degenerative disc disease and aging. With degeneration, the disc components – the nucleus pulposus and annulus fibrosus – become exposed to altered loads. Specifically, the nucleus becomes fibrous and stiff and less able to bear load. Excess load is transferred to the annulus, which may then develop fissures as a result. If the fissures reach the periphery of the annulus, the nuclear material can pass through as a disc herniation.

Mutations in several genes have been implicated in intervertebral disc degeneration. Probable candidate genes include type I collagen (sp1 site), type IX collagen, vitamin D receptor, aggrecan, asporin, MMP3, interleukin-1, and interleukin-6 polymorphisms. Mutation in genes – such as MMP2 and THBS2 – that encode for proteins and enzymes involved in the regulation of the extracellular matrix has been shown to contribute to lumbar disc herniation.

Disc herniations may result from general wear and tear, such as weightlifting training, constant sitting or squatting, driving, or a sedentary lifestyle. Herniations can also result from the lifting of heavy loads.

Professional athletes, especially those playing contact sports, such as American football, Rugby, ice hockey, and wrestling, are known to be prone to disc herniations as well as some limited contact sports that require repetitive flexion and compression such as soccer, baseball, basketball, and volleyball. Within athletic contexts, herniation is often the result of sudden blunt impacts against, or abrupt bending or torsional movements of, the lower back.

== Pathophysiology ==
The majority of disc herniations occur in the lumbar spine (95% at L4–L5 or L5–S1). The second most common site is the cervical region (C5–C6, C6–C7). The thoracic region accounts for only 1–2% of cases. Herniations usually occur postero-laterally, at the points where the annulus fibrosus is relatively thin and is not reinforced by the posterior or anterior longitudinal ligament. In the cervical spine, a symptomatic posterolateral herniation between two vertebrae will impinge on the nerve that exits the spinal canal between those two vertebrae on that side. So, for example, a right posterolateral herniation of the disc between vertebrae C5 and C6 will impinge on the right C6 spinal nerve. The rest of the spinal cord, however, is oriented differently, so a symptomatic posterolateral herniation between two vertebrae will impinge on the nerve exiting at the next intervertebral level down.

=== Lumbar disc herniation ===
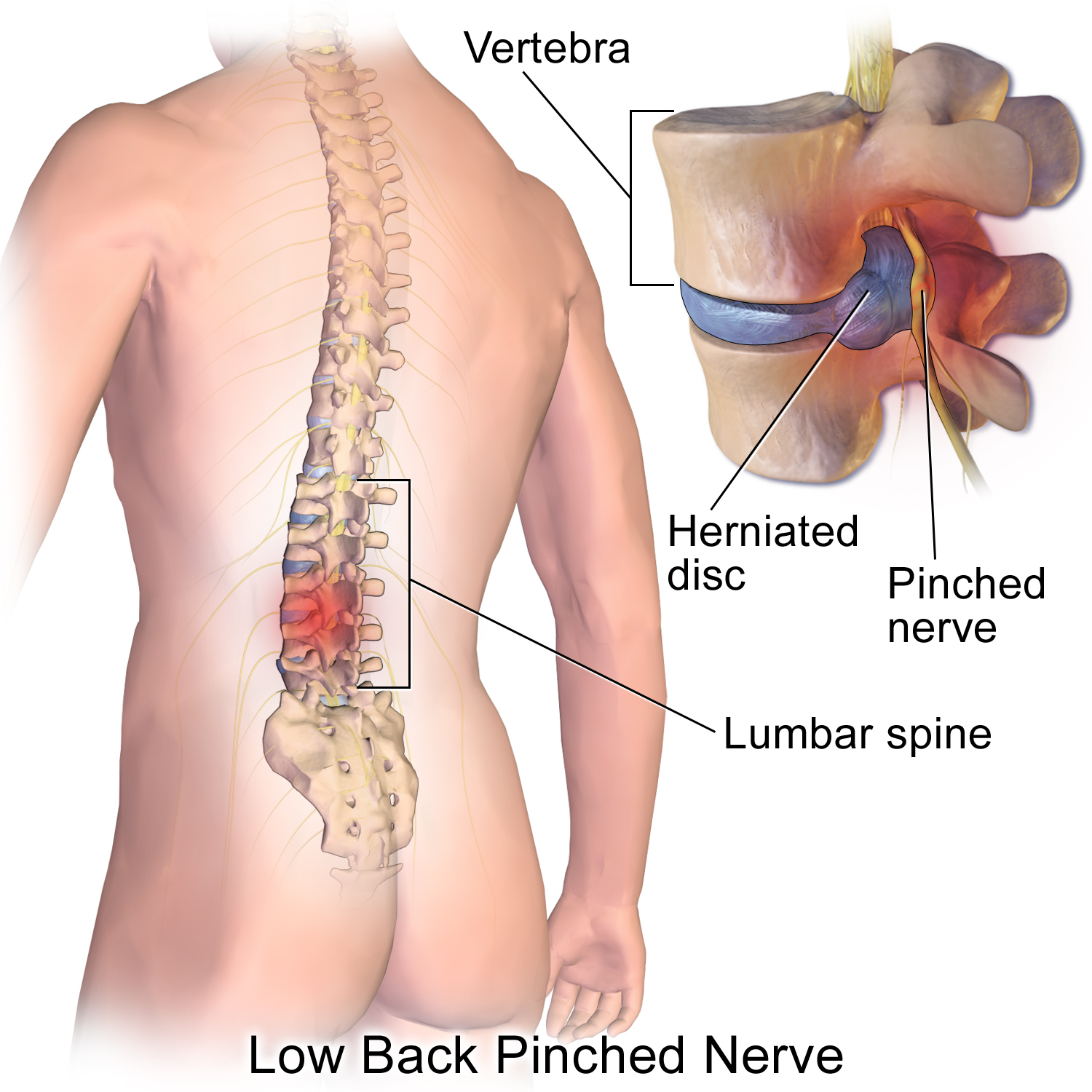
Herniated lumbar disc

Lumbar disc herniations occur in the back, most often between the fourth and fifth lumbar vertebral bodies or between the fifth and the sacrum. Here, symptoms can be felt in the lower back, buttocks, thigh, anal/genital region (via the perineal nerve), and may radiate into the foot and/or toe. The sciatic nerve is the most commonly affected nerve, causing symptoms of sciatica. The femoral nerve can also be affected and cause the patient to experience a numb, tingling feeling throughout one or both legs and even feet or a burning feeling in the hips and legs. A herniation in the lumbar region often compresses the nerve root exiting at the level below the disc. Thus, a herniation of the L4–5 disc compresses the L5 nerve root, only if the herniation is posterolateral.

=== Cervical disc herniation ===
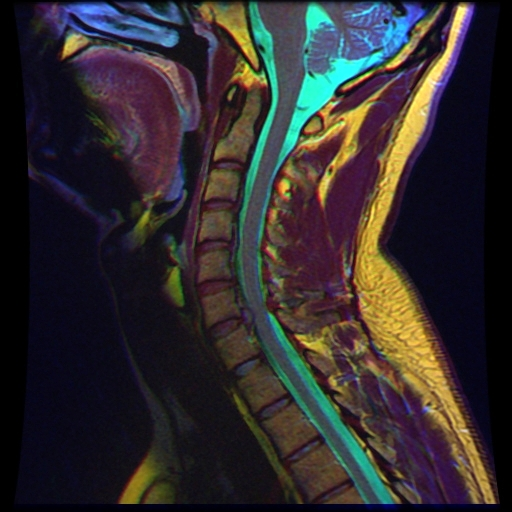
Herniated disc at C6–C7 level

Cervical disc herniations occur in the neck, most often between the fifth and sixth (C5–6) and the sixth and seventh (C6–7) cervical vertebral bodies. There is an increased susceptibility amongst older (60+) patients to herniations higher in the neck, especially at C3–4. Symptoms of cervical herniations may be felt in the back of the skull, the neck, shoulder girdle, scapula, arm, and hand. The nerves of the cervical plexus and brachial plexus can be affected.

Common causes of disc herniation at C5–6 or C7–T1 (often mistakenly called C7–8) levels can be grouped into mechanical, degenerative, or traumatic causes.

Degenerative changes relate to age-related changes, degenerative disc disease, or bone spurs that naturally degenerate the disc.

Poor posture, heavy lifting, or repetitive neck movements (common in athletes or drivers) can cause strain on the disc.

Finally, genetic factors like inherited predisposition can cause faster disintegration.

=== Intradural disc herniation ===
Intradural disc herniation occurs when the disc material crosses the dura mater and enters the thecal sac. It is a rare form of disc herniation with an incidence of 0.2–2.2%. Pre-operative imaging can be helpful for diagnosis, but intra-operative findings are required for confirmation.

=== Inflammation ===
It is increasingly recognized that back pain resulting from disc herniation is not always due solely to nerve compression of the spinal cord or nerve roots, but may also be caused by chemical inflammation. There is evidence that points to a specific inflammatory mediator in back pain: an inflammatory molecule, called tumor necrosis factor alpha (TNF), is released not only by a herniated disc, but also in cases of disc tear (annulus tear) by facet joints, and in spinal stenosis. In addition to causing pain and inflammation, TNF may contribute to disc degeneration.

== Diagnosis ==
=== Terminology ===
Terms commonly used to describe the condition include herniated disc, prolapsed disc, ruptured disc, and slipped disc. Other conditions that are closely related include disc protrusion, radiculopathy (pinched nerve), sciatica, disc disease, disc degeneration, degenerative disc disease, and black disc (a totally degenerated spinal disc).

The popular term slipped disc is a misnomer, as the intervertebral discs are tightly sandwiched between two vertebrae to which they are attached, and cannot actually "slip", or even get out of place. The disc is actually grown together with the adjacent vertebrae and can be squeezed, stretched, and twisted, all in small degrees. It can also be torn, ripped, herniated, and degenerated, but it cannot "slip". Some authors consider that the term slipped disc is harmful, as it leads to an incorrect idea of what has occurred and thus of the likely outcome. However, during growth, one vertebral body can slip relative to an adjacent vertebral body, a deformity called spondylolisthesis.

Spinal disc herniation is known in Latin as prolapsus disci intervertebralis.

Click images to see larger versions

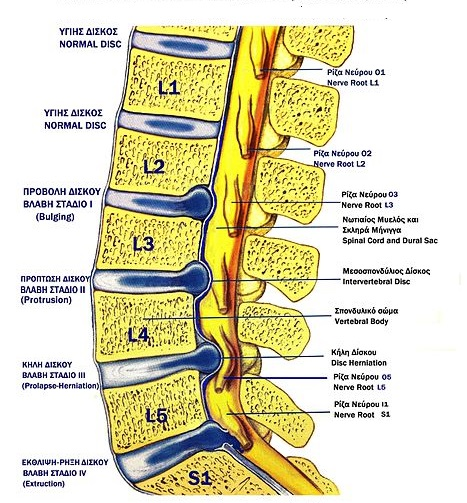
Lumbar disc lesions, classification

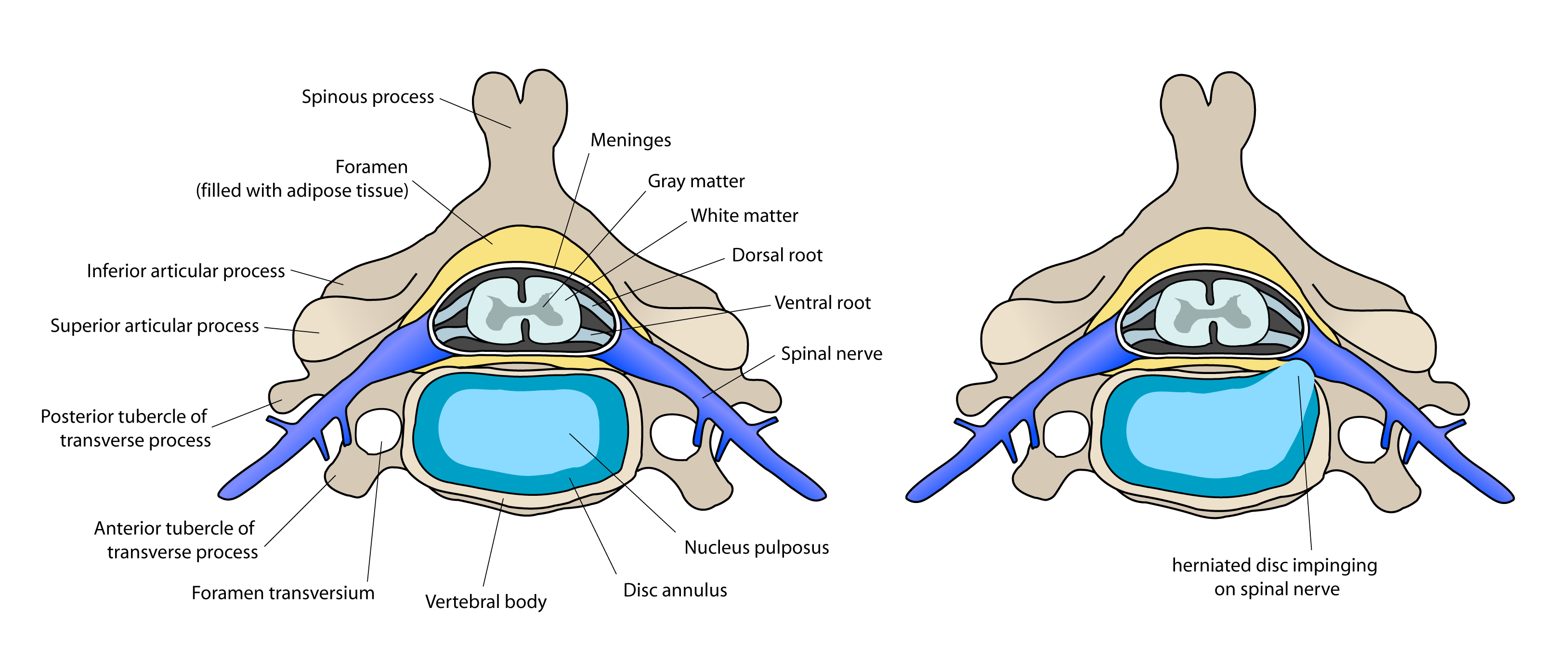
Normal situation and spinal disc herniation in cervical vertebrae

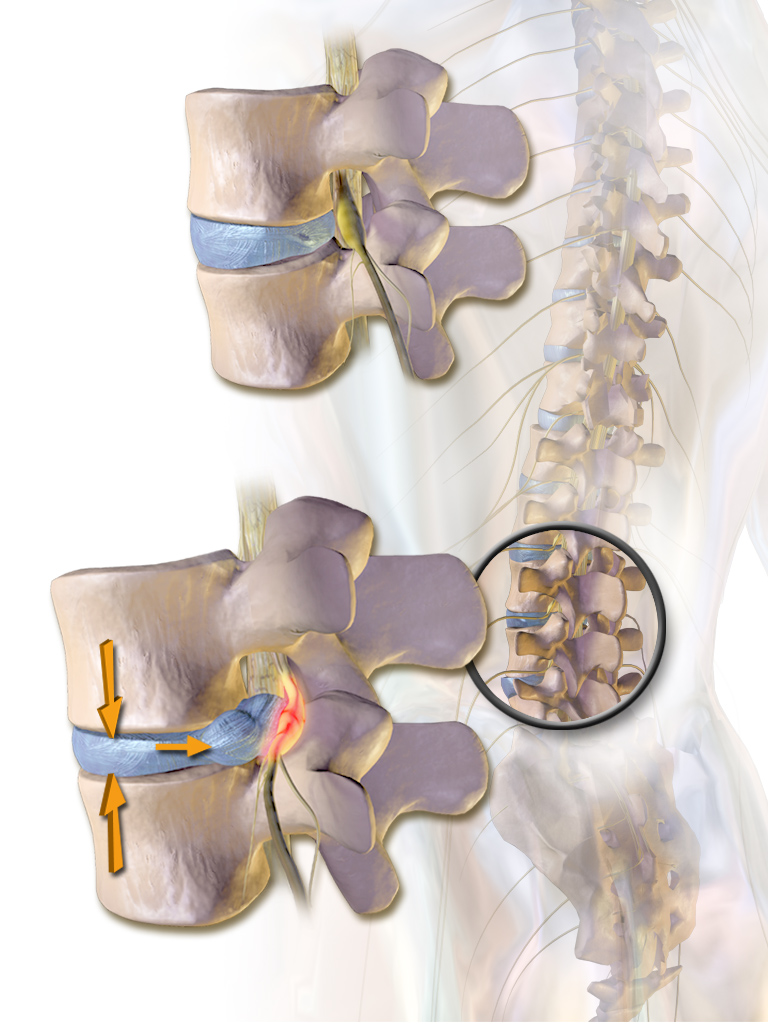
Illustration depicting herniated disc and spinal nerve compression

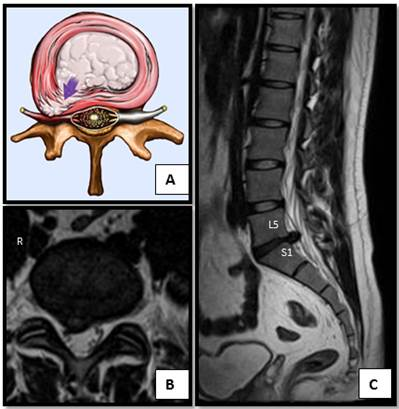
Nucleus herniating through tear in annulus (with MRI)

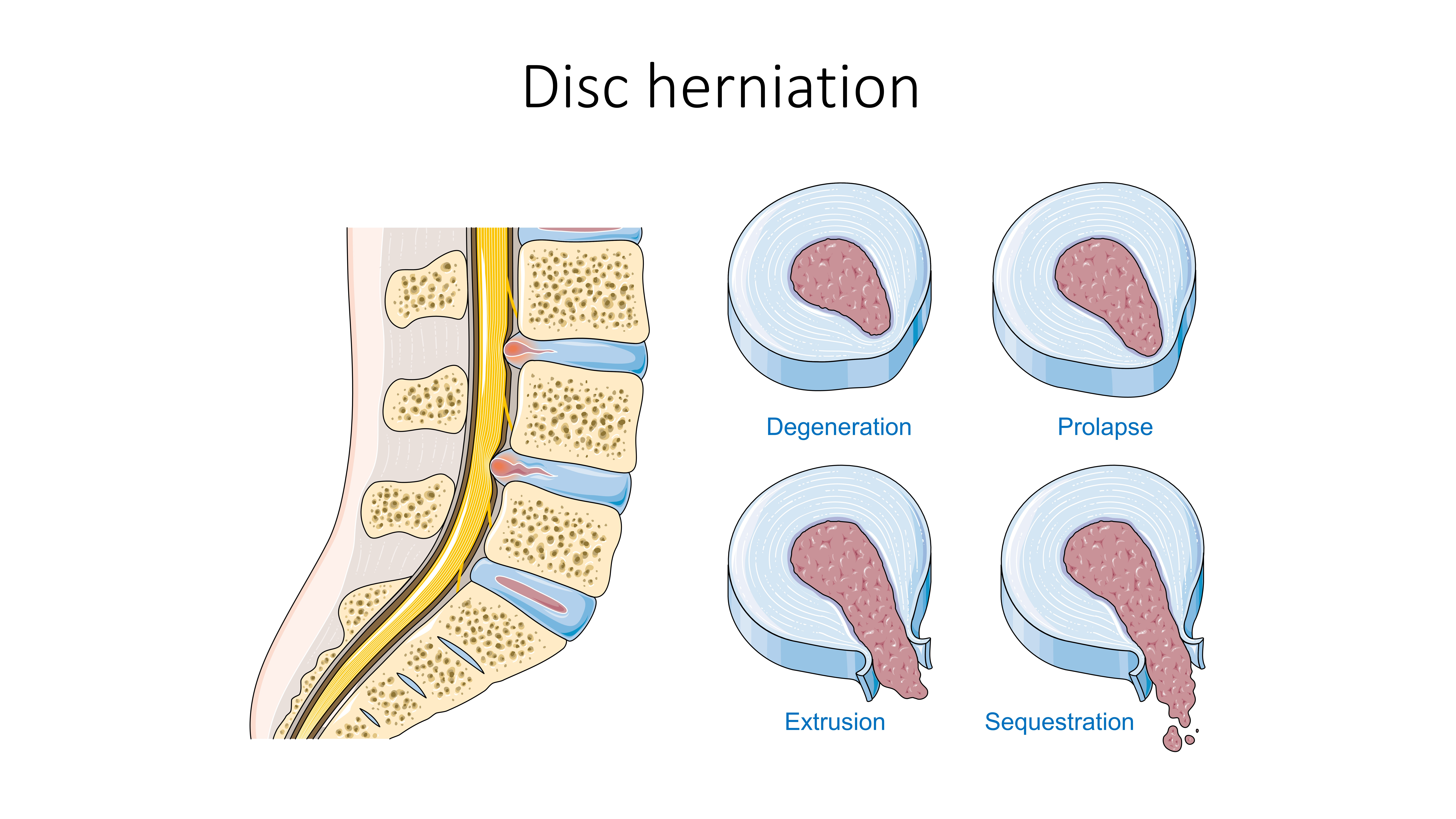
Illustration showing disc degeneration, prolapse, extrusion and sequestration

=== Physical examination ===
Diagnosis of spinal disc herniation is made by a practitioner based on a patient's history and symptoms, and by physical examination. During an evaluation, tests may be performed to confirm or rule out other possible causes with similar symptoms – spondylolisthesis, degeneration, tumors, metastases and space-occupying lesions, for instance – as well as to evaluate the efficacy of potential treatment options.

==== Straight leg raise ====
The straight leg raise is often used as a preliminary test for possible lumbar disc herniation. A variation is to lift the leg while the patient is sitting. However, this reduces the sensitivity of the test. A Cochrane review published in 2010 found that individual diagnostic tests, including the straight leg raising test, absence of tendon reflexes, or muscle weakness, were not very accurate when conducted in isolation.

=== Spinal imaging ===
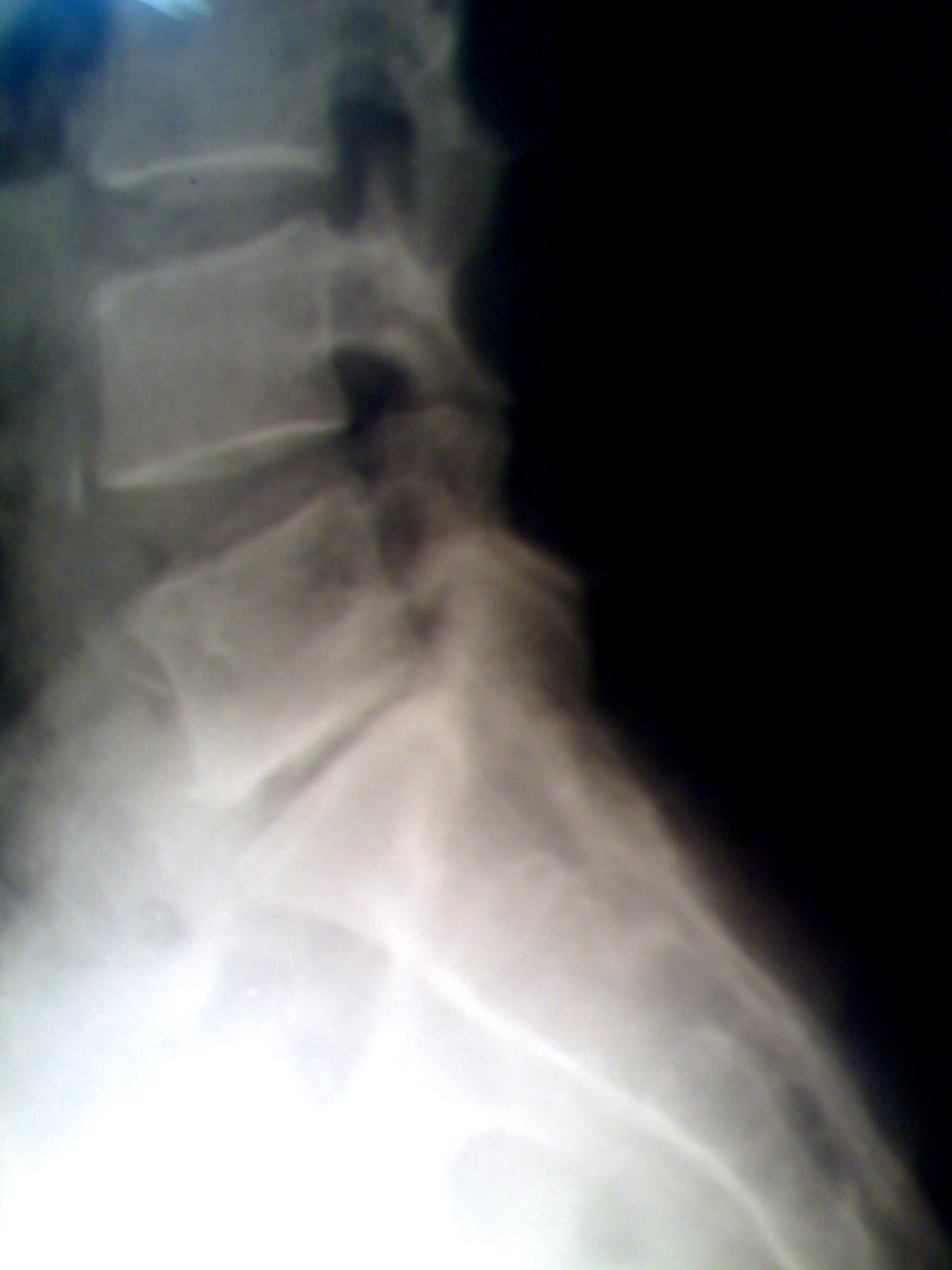
Narrowed space between L5 and S1 vertebrae, indicating probable prolapsed intervertebral disc – a classic picture

- Projectional radiography (X-ray imaging). Traditional plain X-rays are limited in their ability to image soft tissues such as discs, muscles, and nerves, but they are still used to confirm or exclude other possibilities such as tumors, infections, fractures, etc. In spite of their limitations, X-rays play a relatively inexpensive role in confirming the suspicion of the presence of a herniated disc. If a suspicion is thus strengthened, other methods may be used to provide final confirmation.
- Computed tomography scan is the most sensitive imaging modality to examine the bony structures of the spine. CT imaging allows for the evaluation of calcified herniated discs or any pathological process that may result in bone loss or destruction. It is deficient for the visualization of nerve roots, making it unsuitable for diagnosing radiculopathy.
- Magnetic resonance imaging is the gold standard study for confirming a suspected LDH. With a diagnostic accuracy of 97%, it is the most sensitive study to visualize a herniated disc due to its significant ability in soft tissue visualization. MRI also has higher inter-observer reliability than other imaging modalities. It suggests disc herniation when it shows an increased T2-weighted signal at the posterior 10% of the disc. Degenerative disc diseases have shown to correlate with Modic type 1 changes. When evaluating for postoperative lumbar radiculopathies, the recommendation is that the MRI is performed with contrast unless otherwise contraindicated. MRI is more effective than CT in distinguishing inflammatory or malignant etiologies of LDH. It is indicated relatively early in the course of evaluation (<8 weeks) when the patient presents with relative indications like significant pain, neurological motor deficits, and cauda equina syndrome. Diffusion tensor imaging is a type of MRI sequence used for detecting microstructural changes in the nerve root. It may be beneficial in understanding the changes that occur after a herniated lumbar disc compresses a nerve root, and might help in differentiating patients who need surgical intervention. In patients with a high suspicion of radiculopathy due to lumbar disc herniation, yet the MRI is equivocal or negative, nerve conduction studies are indicated. T2-weighted images allow for clear visualization of protruded disc material in the spinal canal.
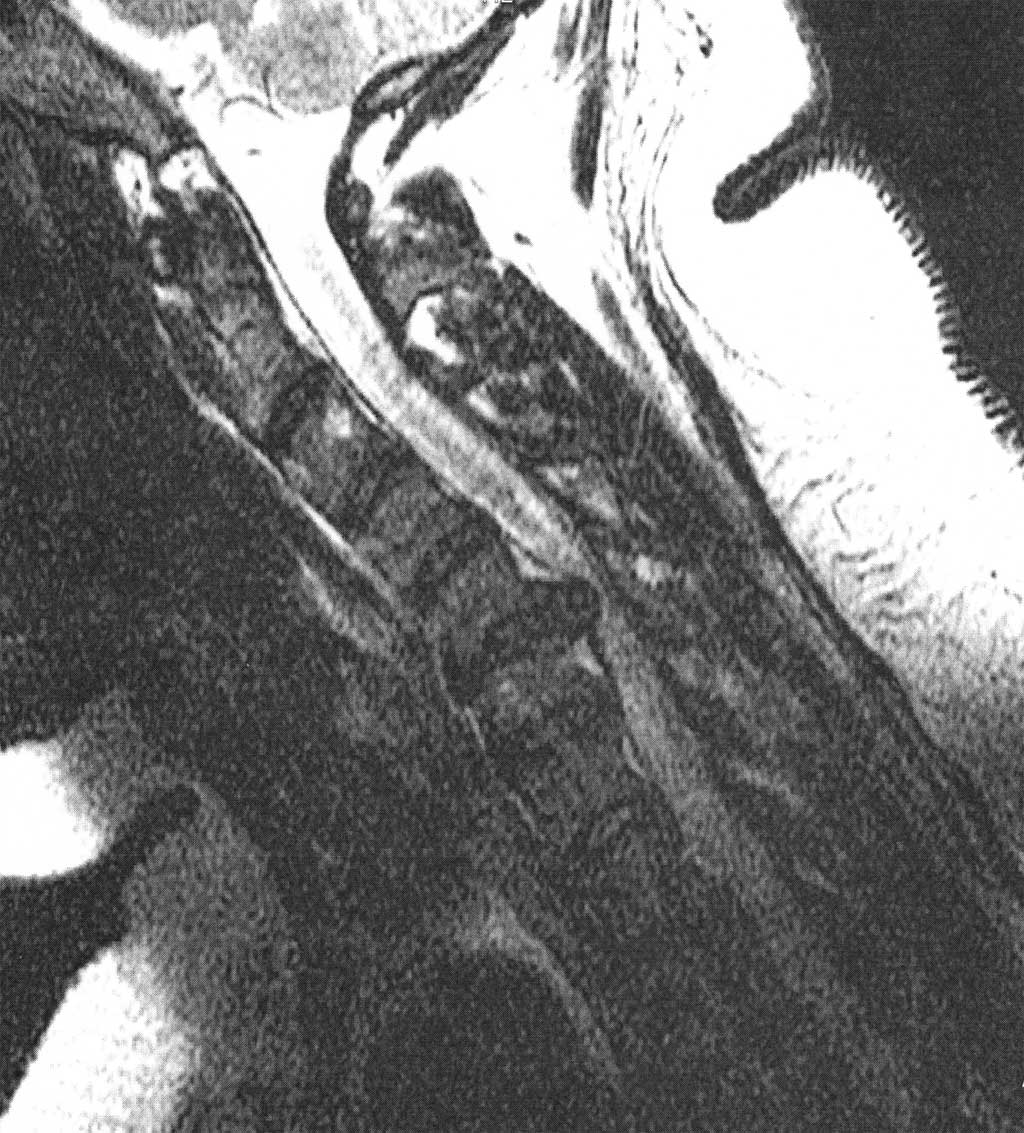
MRI scan of cervical disc herniation between C5 and C6 vertebrae

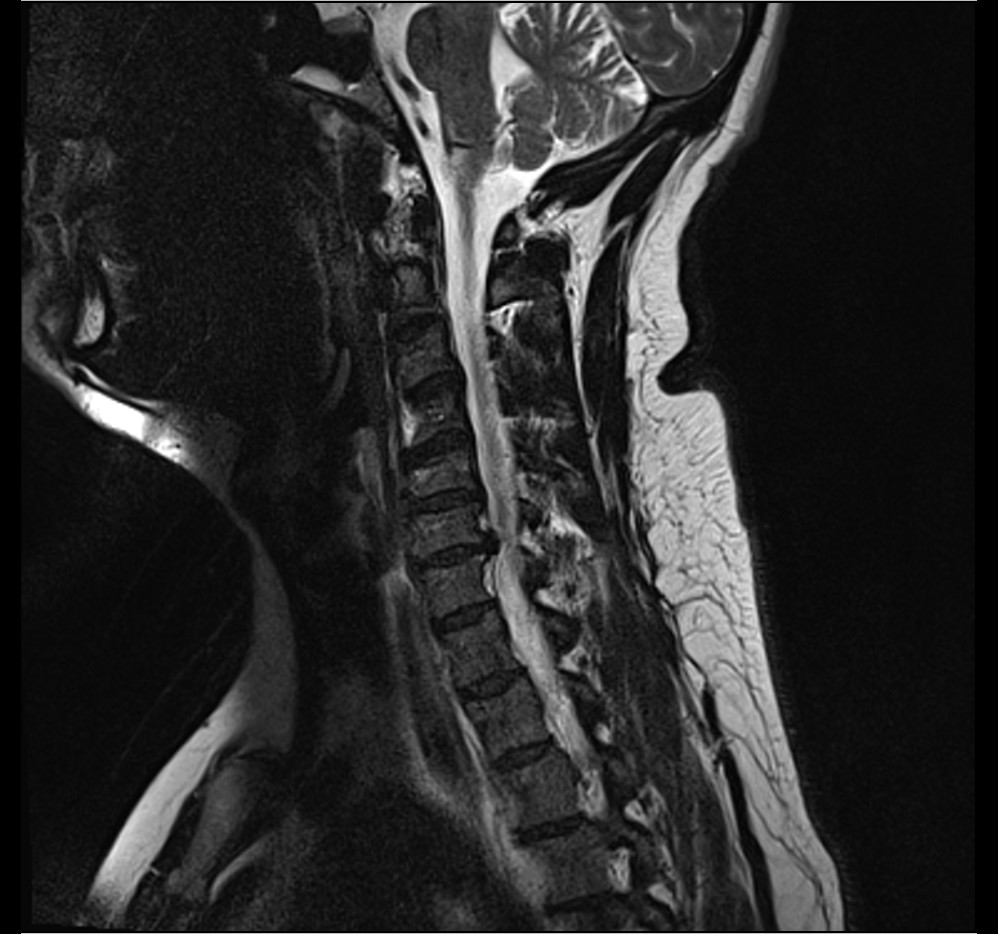
MRI scan of cervical disc herniation between C6 and C7 vertebrae

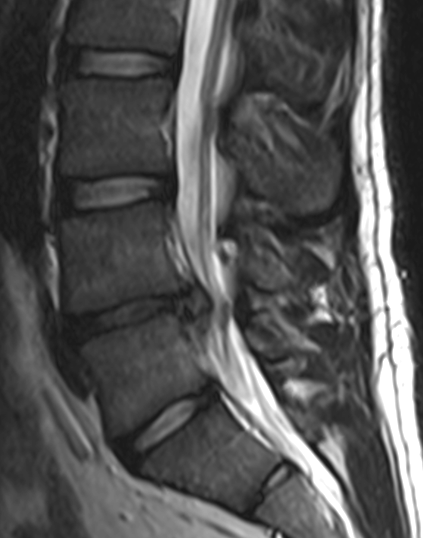
MRI scan of large herniation (on the right) of the disc between L4 and L5 vertebrae

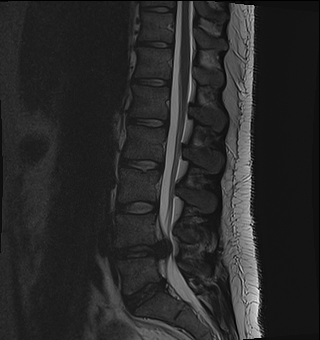
A rather severe herniation of the L4–L5 disc

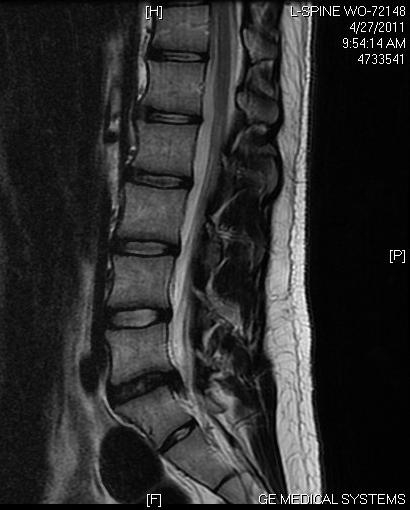
Example of a herniated disc at L5–S1 in the lumbar spine
- Myelography. An X-ray of the spinal canal following injection of a contrast material into the surrounding cerebrospinal fluid spaces will reveal displacement of the contrast material. It can show the presence of structures that can cause pressure on the spinal cord or nerves, such as herniated discs, tumors, or bone spurs. Because myelography involves the injection of foreign substances, MRI scans are now preferred for most patients. Myelograms still provide excellent outlines of space-occupying lesions, especially when combined with CT scanning (CT myelography). CT myelography is the imaging modality of choice to visualize herniated discs in patients with contraindications for an MRI. However, due to its invasiveness, the assistance of a trained radiologist is required. Myelography is associated with risks like post-spinal headache, meningeal infection, and radiation exposure. Recent advances with a multidetector CT scan have made the diagnostic level of it nearly equal to the MRI.
- The presence and severity of myelopathy can be evaluated by means of transcranial magnetic stimulation (TMS), a neurophysiological method that measures the time required for a neural impulse to cross the pyramidal tracts, starting from the cerebral cortex and ending at the anterior horn cells of the cervical, thoracic, or lumbar spinal cord. This measurement is called the central conduction time (CCT). TMS can aid physicians to:
  - Determine if myelopathy exists
  - Identify the level of the spinal cord where myelopathy is located. This is especially useful in cases where more than two lesions may be responsible for the clinical symptoms and signs, such as in patients with two or more cervical disc hernias
  - Assess the progression of myelopathy over time, for example, before and after cervical spine surgery
  - TMS can also help in the differential diagnosis of different causes of pyramidal tract damage.
- Electromyography and nerve conduction studies (EMG/NCS) measure the electrical impulses along nerve roots, peripheral nerves, and muscle tissue. Tests can indicate whether there is ongoing nerve damage, whether the nerves are healing from a past injury, or whether there is another site of nerve compression. EMG/NCS studies are typically used to pinpoint the sources of nerve dysfunction distal to the spine.

=== Differential diagnosis ===
The cause of almost all low back pain is mechanical, but there are several other conditions apart from disc herniation that include that symptom.Tests may be required to distinguish spinal disc herniations from other conditions with similar symptoms.

- Discogenic pain
- Mechanical pain
- Myofascial pain
- Abscess
- Aortic dissection
- Discitis or osteomyelitis
- Hematoma
- Mass lesion or malignancy
- Benign tumor like neurinoma or meningeoma
- Myocardial infarction
- Sacroiliac joint dysfunction
- Spinal stenosis
- Spondylosis or spondylolisthesis

== Prevention ==
Because there are various causes of back injuries, prevention must be comprehensive. Back injuries are predominant in manual labor, so the majority of low back pain prevention methods have been applied primarily toward biomechanics. Prevention must come from multiple sources such as education, proper body mechanics, and physical fitness.

=== Education ===
Education should emphasize not lifting beyond one's capabilities and allowing the body a rest after strenuous effort. Over time, poor posture can cause the intervertebral disc to tear or become damaged. Striving to maintain proper posture and body alignment will help prevent disc degradation.

=== Exercise ===
Exercises that strengthen the back may also prevent back injuries. Back exercises include the prone push-ups/press-ups, upper back extension, transverse abdominis bracing, and floor bridges. If back pain is present, it may suggest that the back's stabilizer muscles are weak and a person needs to train the trunk musculature. Other preventative measures are losing weight and not working oneself past fatigue. Signs of fatigue include shaking, poor coordination, muscle burning, and loss of the transverse abdominal brace. Heavy lifting should be done with the legs, not the back.

Swimming is a common tool used in strength training. The use of lumbar-sacral support belts may restrict spinal movement and support the back during lifting.

== Treatment ==
In the majority of cases, spinal disc herniation can be treated successfully conservatively, without surgical removal of the herniated material. Sciatica is a set of symptoms associated with lumbar disc herniation. A study on sciatica showed that about one-third of patients with sciatica recover within two weeks after presentation with conservative measures alone, and about three-quarters recover after three months of conservative treatment. However, sciatica may also less commonly be caused by nerve compression by muscles, tumors and other masses, and the study did not indicate the number of individuals with sciatica that had disc herniations.

Initial treatment usually consists of nonsteroidal anti-inflammatory drugs (NSAIDs), but potential cardiovascular and gastrointestinal toxicities complicate the long-term use of NSAIDs for people with persistent back pain.

Epidural corticosteroid injections provide a slight and questionable short-term improvement for those with sciatica, but are of no long-term benefit. Complications occur in up to 17% of cases when injections are performed on the neck, though most are minor. In 2014, the US Food and Drug Administration (FDA) suggested that the "injection of corticosteroids into the epidural space of the spine may result in rare but serious adverse events, including loss of vision, stroke, paralysis, and death", and that "the effectiveness and safety of epidural administration of corticosteroids have not been established, and FDA has not approved corticosteroids for this use".

=== Lumbar disc herniation (LDH) ===
Non-surgical treatment methods are usually attempted first. Pain medications may be prescribed to alleviate acute pain and allow the patient to begin exercising and stretching. There are several non-surgical methods used in attempts to relieve the condition. They are considered indicated, contraindicated, relatively contraindicated, or inconclusive, depending on the safety profile of their risk–benefit ratio and on whether they may or may not help:

==== Indicated ====
- Education on proper body mechanics
- Physical therapy to address mechanical factors, and may include modalities to temporarily relieve pain (i.e., traction, electrical stimulation, massage)
- Nonsteroidal anti-inflammatory drugs (NSAIDs)
- Weight control
- Spinal manipulation. Moderate quality evidence suggests that spinal manipulation is more effective than placebo for the treatment of acute (less than 3 months duration) lumbar disc herniation and acute sciatica. The same study also found "low to very low" evidence for its usefulness in treating chronic lumbar symptoms (more than 3 months) and "the quality of evidence for ... cervical spine-related extremity symptoms of any duration is low or very low". A 2006 review of published research states that spinal manipulation "is likely to be safe when used by appropriately-trained practitioners", and research currently suggests that spinal manipulation is safe for the treatment of disc-related pain.

==== Contraindicated ====
- Spinal manipulation is contraindicated when the etiology of the herniation is the result of a Motor Vehicle Collision (MVC)
- Spinal manipulation is contraindicated for disc herniations when there are progressive neurological deficits such as with cauda equina syndrome.
- A review of non-surgical spinal decompression found shortcomings in most published studies and concluded that there was only "very limited evidence in the scientific literature to support the effectiveness of non-surgical spinal decompression therapy". Its use and marketing have been very controversial.

==== Surgery ====
Surgery may be useful when a herniated disc is causing significant pain radiating into the leg, significant leg weakness, bladder problems, or loss of bowel control.

- Discectomy (the partial removal of a disc that is causing leg pain) can provide pain relief sooner than non-surgical treatments.
- Small endoscopic discectomy (called nano-endoscopic discectomy) is non-invasive and does not cause failed back syndrome.
- Invasive microdiscectomy with a one-inch skin opening has not been shown to result in a significantly different outcome from larger-opening discectomy with respect to pain. It might, however, have a lower risk of infection.
- Failed back syndrome is a significant, potentially disabling, result that can arise following invasive spine surgery to treat disc herniation. Smaller spine procedures such as endoscopic transforaminal lumbar discectomy cannot cause failed back syndrome, because no bone is removed.
- The presence of Cauda equina syndrome (in which there is incontinence, weakness, and genital numbness) is considered a medical emergency requiring immediate attention and possibly surgical decompression.

When different forms of surgical treatments, including discectomy, microdiscectomy, and chemonucleolysis, were compared, evidence was suggestive rather than conclusive. A Cochrane review from 2007 reported: "surgical discectomy for carefully selected patients with sciatica due to a prolapsed lumbar disc appears to provide faster relief from the acute attack than non‐surgical management. However, any positive or negative effects on the lifetime natural history of the underlying disc disease are unclear. Microdiscectomy gives broadly comparable results to standard discectomy. There is insufficient evidence on other surgical techniques to draw firm conclusions." Regarding the role of surgery for failed medical therapy in people without a significant neurological deficit, a Cochrane review concluded that "limited evidence is now available to support some aspects of surgical practice".

Following surgery, rehabilitation programs are often implemented. There is wide variation in what these programs entail. A Cochrane review found low- to very low-quality evidence that patients who participated in high-intensity exercise programs had slightly less short term pain and disability compared to low-intensity exercise programs. There was no difference between supervised and home exercise programs.

== Epidemiology ==
Disc herniation can occur in any disc in the spine, but the two most common forms are lumbar disc herniation and cervical disc herniation. The former is the most common, causing low back pain (lumbago) and often leg pain as well, in which case it is commonly referred to as sciatica. Lumbar disc herniation occurs 15 times more often than cervical (neck) disc herniation, and it is one of the most common causes of low back pain. The cervical discs are affected 8% of the time and the upper-to-mid-back (thoracic) discs only 1–2% of the time.The following locations have no discs and are therefore exempt from the risk of disc herniation: the upper two cervical intervertebral spaces, the sacrum, and the coccyx. Most disc herniations occur when a person is in their thirties or forties, when the nucleus pulposus is still a gelatin-like substance. With age, the nucleus pulposus changes ("dries out"), and the risk of herniation is greatly reduced. After age 50 or 60, osteoarthritic degeneration (spondylosis) or spinal stenosis are more likely causes of low back pain or leg pain.

- 4.8% of males and 2.5% of females older than 35 experience sciatica during their lifetime.

Of all individuals, 60% to 80% experience back pain during their lifetime.

- In 14%, pain lasts more than two weeks.
- Generally, males have a slightly higher incidence than females.

== Research ==
Future treatments may include stem cell therapy.

== See also ==
- Cauda equina syndrome
- Degenerative disc disease
- Discectomy
- Persistent spinal pain syndrome (formerly: Failed back surgery syndrome)
- Herniation
- Inflammation
- Intervertebral disc
- Low back pain
- Nerve compression syndrome
- Neuroinflammation
- Radiculopathy
- Sciatica
- Spinal stenosis
