= ASPN =

ASPN may refer to:

- A common abbreviation of Asporin
- American standard pitch notation, a method to specify musical pitch
- Arizona Sports Programming Network, now known as YurView Arizona
