= Shoulder Abduction Relief Test =

Clinical medicine

- Purpose: assess nerve root pain

The shoulder abduction relief test, also called Bakody's test, is a medical maneuver used to evaluate for cervical radiculopathy. Specifically, this test is used to evaluate for nerve root compression at C5-C7. It is often used when a patient presents with neck pain that radiates down the ipsilateral upper extremity. The patient's shoulder is abducted by lifting the affected arm above their head either actively or passively. A decrease in radicular symptoms upon shoulder abduction would be considered a positive Bakody's sign and is indicative of nerve root compression.

== Mechanism ==
Reduced tension at the nerve root upon shoulder abduction has been identified as the probable mechanism that leads to relief of the pain. Studies on the effect of shoulder abduction on neuroforaminal pressures have provided some support for this claim.

== Accuracy ==
A 2007 meta-analysis described the shoulder abduction relief test as having low to moderate sensitivity and moderate to high specificity. Another study in 1981 found that 15 of 22 patients with unremitting radicular pain reported relief with shoulder abduction.
