= Radiculopathy =

Pinched nerve

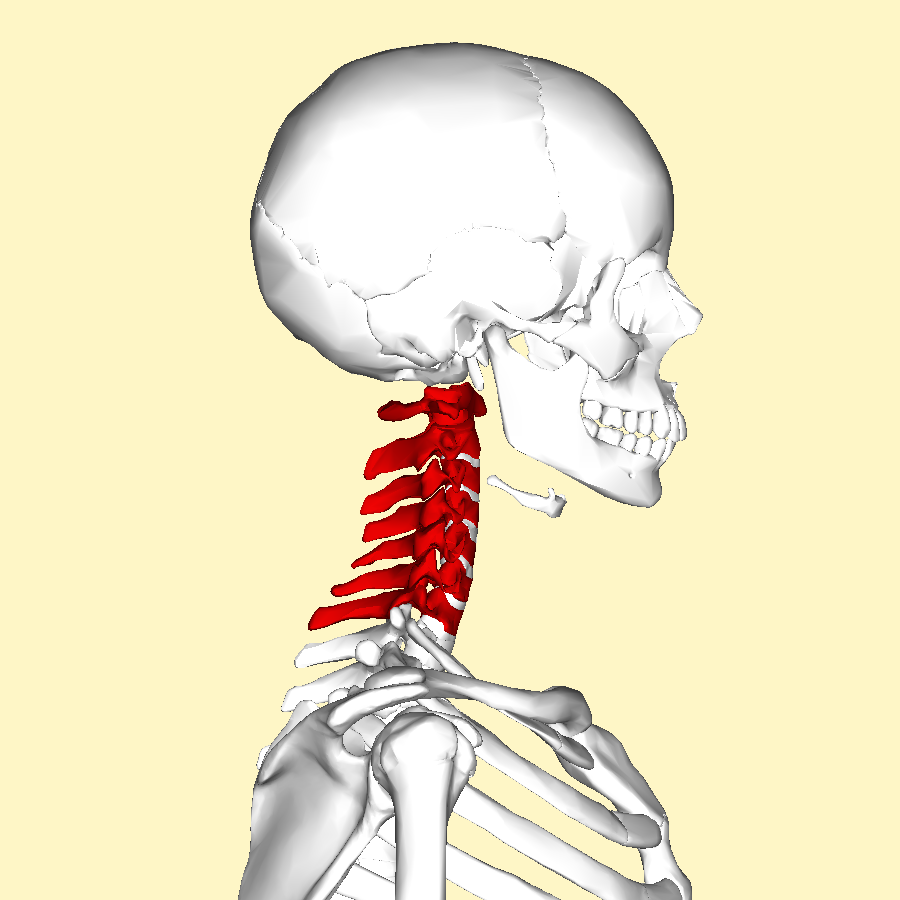
- C5-C6, followed by C6-C7, is the most common location for radiculopathy in the neck.
- Specialty: Neurosurgery

Radiculopathy (from Latin radix 'root' and Ancient Greek πάθος (pathos) 'suffering'), also commonly referred to as pinched nerve, refers to a set of conditions in which one or more nerves are affected and do not work properly (a neuropathy). Radiculopathy can result in pain (radicular pain), weakness, altered sensation (paresthesia) or difficulty controlling specific muscles. Pinched nerves arise when surrounding bone or tissue, such as cartilage, muscles or tendons, put pressure on the nerve and disrupt its function.

In a radiculopathy, the problem occurs at or near the root of the nerve, shortly after its exit from the spinal cord. However, the pain or other symptoms often radiate to the part of the body served by that nerve. For example, a nerve root impingement in the neck can produce pain and weakness in the forearm. Likewise, an impingement in the lower back or lumbar-sacral spine can be manifested with symptoms in the foot.

The radicular pain that results from a radiculopathy should not be confused with referred pain, which is different both in mechanism and clinical features. Polyradiculopathy refers to the condition where more than one spinal nerve root is affected.

== Causes ==
Brachial plexus. C6 and C7 nerves affected most frequently.

Radiculopathy most often is caused by mechanical compression of a nerve root usually at the exit foramen or lateral recess. It may be secondary to intervertebral disk herniation (most commonly at C7 and then the C6 level), degenerative disc disease, osteoarthritis, facet joint degeneration/hypertrophy, ligamentous hypertrophy, spondylolisthesis, or a combination of these factors. Other possible causes of radiculopathy include neoplastic disease, infections such as shingles, HIV, or Lyme disease, spinal epidural abscess, spinal epidural hematoma, proximal diabetic neuropathy, Tarlov cysts, or, more rarely, sarcoidosis, arachnoiditis, tethered spinal cord syndrome, or transverse myelitis.

Repeated, longer term exposure (5 years or more) to certain work-related activities may put people at risk of developing lumbosacral radiculopathy. These behaviours may include physically demanding work, bending over or twisting at the trunk, lifting and carrying, or a combination of these activities.

Less common causes of radiculopathy include injury caused by tumor (which can compress nerve roots locally) and diabetes (which can effectively cause ischemia or lack of blood flow to nerves).

== Diagnosis ==
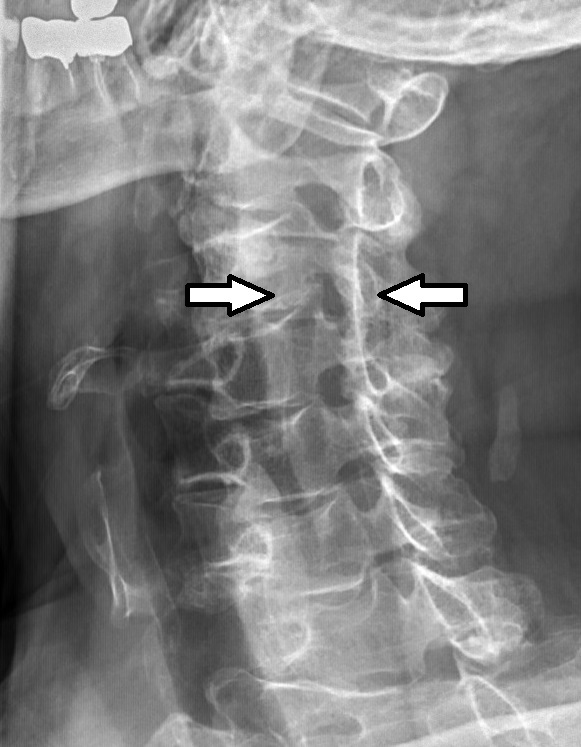
Oblique projectional radiograph of a man presenting with pain by the nape and left shoulder, showing a stenosis of the left intervertebral foramen of cervical spinal nerve 4, corresponding with the affected dermatome

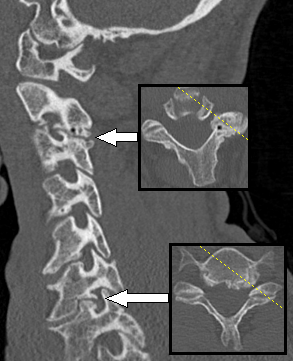
CT scan of a man presenting with radiculopathy of the left cervical spinal nerve 7, corresponding to spondylosis with osteophytes between the vertebral bodies C6 and C7 on the left side, causing foraminal stenosis at this level (lower arrow, showing axial plane). There is also spondylosis of the facet joint between C2 and C3, with some foraminal stenosis at this level (upper arrow), which appears to be asymptomatic.

Signs and Symptoms

Radiculopathy is a diagnosis commonly made by physicians in primary care specialties, orthopedics, physiatry, and neurology. The diagnosis may be suggested by symptoms of pain, numbness, paresthesia, and weakness in a pattern consistent with the distribution of a particular nerve root, such as sciatica. Neck pain or back pain may also be present. Physical examination may reveal motor and sensory deficits in the distribution of a nerve root. In the case of cervical radiculopathy, Spurling's test may elicit or reproduce symptoms radiating down the arm. Similarly, in the case of lumbosacral radiculopathy, a straight leg raise maneuver or a femoral nerve stretch test may demonstrate radiculopathic symptoms down the leg. Deep tendon reflexes (also known as a stretch reflex) may be diminished or absent in areas innervated by a particular nerve root.

Diagnosis typically involves electromyography and lumbar puncture. Shingles is more common among the elderly and immunocompromised; usually (but not always) pain is followed by appearance of a rash with small blisters along a single dermatome. It can be confirmed by quick laboratory tests. Acute Lyme radiculopathy follows a history of outdoor activities during warmer months in likely tick habitats in the previous 1–12 weeks. In the U.S., Lyme is most common in New England and Mid-Atlantic states and parts of Wisconsin and Minnesota, but it is expanding to other areas. The first manifestation is usually an expanding rash possibly accompanied by flu-like symptoms. Lyme radiculopathy is usually worse at night and accompanied by extreme sleep disturbance, lymphocytic meningitis with variable headache and no fever, and sometimes by facial palsy or Lyme carditis. Lyme can also cause a milder, chronic radiculopathy an average of 8 months after the acute illness. Lyme can be confirmed by blood antibody tests and possibly lumbar puncture. If present, the above conditions should be treated immediately.

Although most cases of radiculopathy are compressive and resolve with conservative treatment within 4–6 weeks, guidelines for managing radiculopathy recommend first excluding possible causes that, although rare, require immediate attention, among them the following. Cauda equina syndrome should be investigated in case of saddle anesthesia, loss of bladder or bowel control, or leg weakness. Cancer should be suspected if there is previous history of cancer, unexplained weight loss, or low-back pain that does not decrease by lying down or is unremitting. Spinal epidural abscess is more common among those with diabetes mellitus or immunocompromised, who use intravenous drugs, or had spinal surgery, injection or catheter; it typically causes fever, leukocytosis and increased erythrocyte sedimentation rate. If any of the previous is suspected, urgent magnetic resonance imaging is recommended for confirmation. Proximal diabetic neuropathy typically affects middle aged and older people with well-controlled type-2 diabetes mellitus; onset is sudden causing pain usually in multiple dermatomes quickly followed by weakness.

Investigations

If symptoms do not improve after 4–6 weeks of conservative treatment, or the person is more than 50 years old, further tests are recommended. The American College of Radiology recommends that projectional radiography is the most appropriate initial study in all patients with chronic neck pain. Two additional diagnostic tests that may be of use are magnetic resonance imaging and electrodiagnostic testing. Magnetic resonance imaging (MRI) of the portion of the spine where radiculopathy is suspected may reveal evidence of degenerative change, arthritic disease, or another explanatory lesion responsible for the patient's symptoms. Electrodiagnostic testing, consisting of NCS (nerve conduction study) and EMG (electromyography), is also a powerful diagnostic tool that may show nerve root injury in suspected areas. On nerve conduction studies, the pattern of diminished compound muscle action potential and normal sensory nerve action potential may be seen given that the lesion is proximal to the posterior root ganglion. Needle EMG is the more sensitive portion of the test, and may reveal active denervation in the distribution of the involved nerve root, and neurogenic-appearing voluntary motor units in more chronic radiculopathies. Given the key role of electrodiagnostic testing in the diagnosis of acute and chronic radiculopathies, the American Association of Neuromuscular & Electrodiagnostic Medicine has issued evidence-based practice guidelines, for the diagnosis of both cervical and lumbosacral radiculopathies. The American Association of Neuromuscular & Electrodiagnostic Medicine has also participated in the Choosing Wisely Campaign and several of their recommendations relate to what tests are unnecessary for neck and back pain.

== Treatment ==
Ideally, effective treatment aims to resolve the underlying cause and restores the nerve root to normal function. Conservative treatment may include bed rest, physical therapy, or simply continuing to do usual activities; for pain, nonsteroidal anti-inflammatory drugs, nonopioid or, in some cases, narcotic analgesics may be prescribed. A systematic review found moderate quality evidence that spinal manipulation is effective for the treatment of acute lumbar radiculopathy and cervical radiculopathy. Only low level evidence was found to support spinal manipulation for the treatment of chronic lumbar radiculopathies, and no evidence was found to exist for treatment of thoracic radiculopathy. Evidence also supports consideration of epidural steroid injection with local anesthetic in improving both pain and function in cases of lumbosacral radiculopathy.

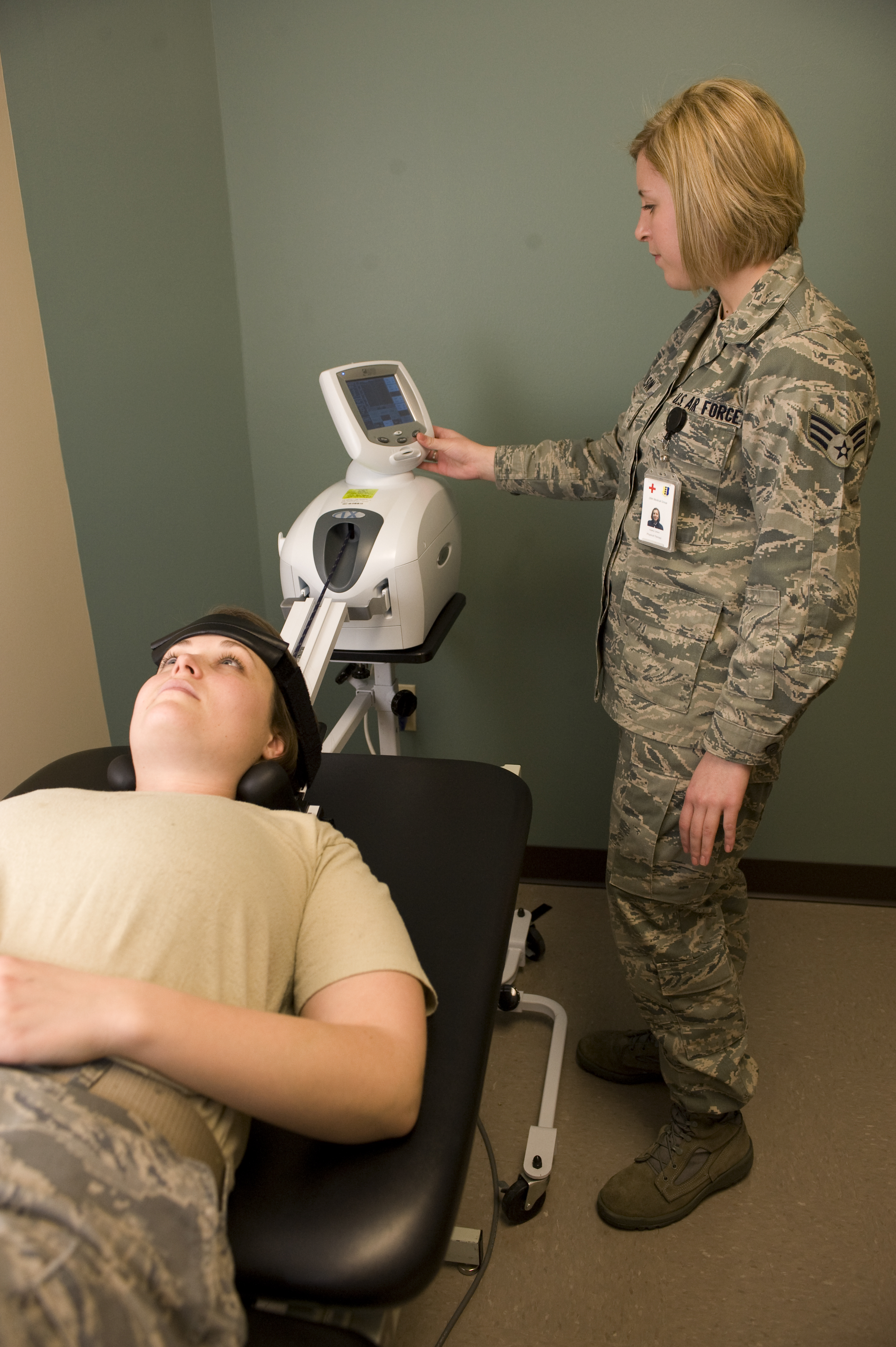
Cervical traction machine

=== Rehabilitation ===
With a recent injury (e.g. one that occurred one week ago), a formal physical therapy referral is not yet indicated. Often mild to moderate injuries will resolve or greatly improve within the first few weeks. Additionally, patients with acute injuries are often too sore to participate effectively in physical therapy so soon after the insult. Waiting two to three weeks is generally recommended before starting formal physical therapy. In acute injury resulting in lumbosacral radiculopathy, conservative treatment such as acetaminophen and NSAIDs should be the first line of therapy.

Therapeutic exercises are frequently used in combination with many of the previously mentioned modalities and with great results. A variety of exercise regimens are available in patient treatment. An exercise regimen should be modified according to the abilities and weaknesses of the patient. Stabilization of the cervicothoracic region is helpful in limiting pain and preventing re-injury. Cervical and lumbar support braces typically are not indicated for radiculopathy, and may lead to weakness of support musculature. The first part of the stabilization procedure is achieving a pain free full range of motion which can be accomplished through stretching exercises. Subsequently, a strengthening exercise program should be designed to restore the deconditioned cervical, shoulder girdle, and upper trunk musculature. As reliance on the neck brace diminishes, an isometric exercise regimen should be introduced. This is a preferred method of exercise during the sub-acute phase because it resists atrophy and is least likely to exacerbate the condition. Single plane resistance exercises against cervical flexion, extension, bending, and rotation are used.

=== Surgery ===
While conservative approaches for rehabilitation are ideal, some patients will not improve and surgery is still an option. Patients with large cervical disk bulges may be recommended for surgery; however, most often, conservative management will help the herniation regress naturally. Procedures such as foraminotomy, laminotomy, or discectomy may be considered by neurosurgeons and orthopedic surgeons. Regarding surgical interventions for cervical radiculopathy, the anterior cervical discectomy and fusion procedure is more commonly performed than the posterior cervical foraminotomy procedure. However, both procedures are likely equally effective and without significant differences in their complication rates.

== Epidemiology ==
Cervical radiculopathy has an annual incidence rate of 107.3 per 100,000 for men and 63.5 per 100,000 for women, whereas lumbar radiculopathy has a prevalence of approximately 3-5% of the population. According to the AHRQ's 2010 National Statistics for cervical radiculopathy, the most affected age group is between 45 and 64 years with 51.03% of incidents. Females are affected more frequently than males and account for 53.69% of cases. Private insurance was the payer in 41.69% of the incidents followed by Medicare with 38.81%. In 71.61% of cases the patients' income was considered not low for their zipcode. Additionally over 50% of patients lived in large metropolitans (inner city or suburb). The South is the most severely affected region in the US with 39.27% of cases. According to a study performed in Minnesota, the most common manifestation of this set of conditions is the C7 monoradiculopathy, followed by C6.

== See also ==
- Peripheral neuropathy
- Shoulder Abduction Relief Test
- Nerve entrapment
- Sciatica
- Paresthesia
