= Femoral nerve stretch test =

- Purpose: related to possible nerve root impingements.

Femoral nerve stretch test, also known as Mackiewicz sign, is a test for spinal nerve root compression, which is associated with disc protrusion and femoral nerve injury.

== Uses ==
The femoral nerve stretch test can identify spinal nerve root compression, which is associated with disc protrusion and femoral nerve injury. It can reliably identify spinal nerve root compression for L2, L3, and L4. It is usually positive for L2-L3 and L3-L4 (high lumbar) disc protrusions, slightly positive or negative in L4–L5 disc protrusions, and negative in cases of lumbosacral disc protrusion.

== Procedure ==
To perform a femoral nerve stretch test, a patient lies prone, the knee is passively flexed to the thigh and the hip is passively extended (reverse Lasègues). The test is positive if the patient experiences anterior thigh pain.
