= Spinal cord stimulator =

Neuromodulation device for implantation in the spinal cord

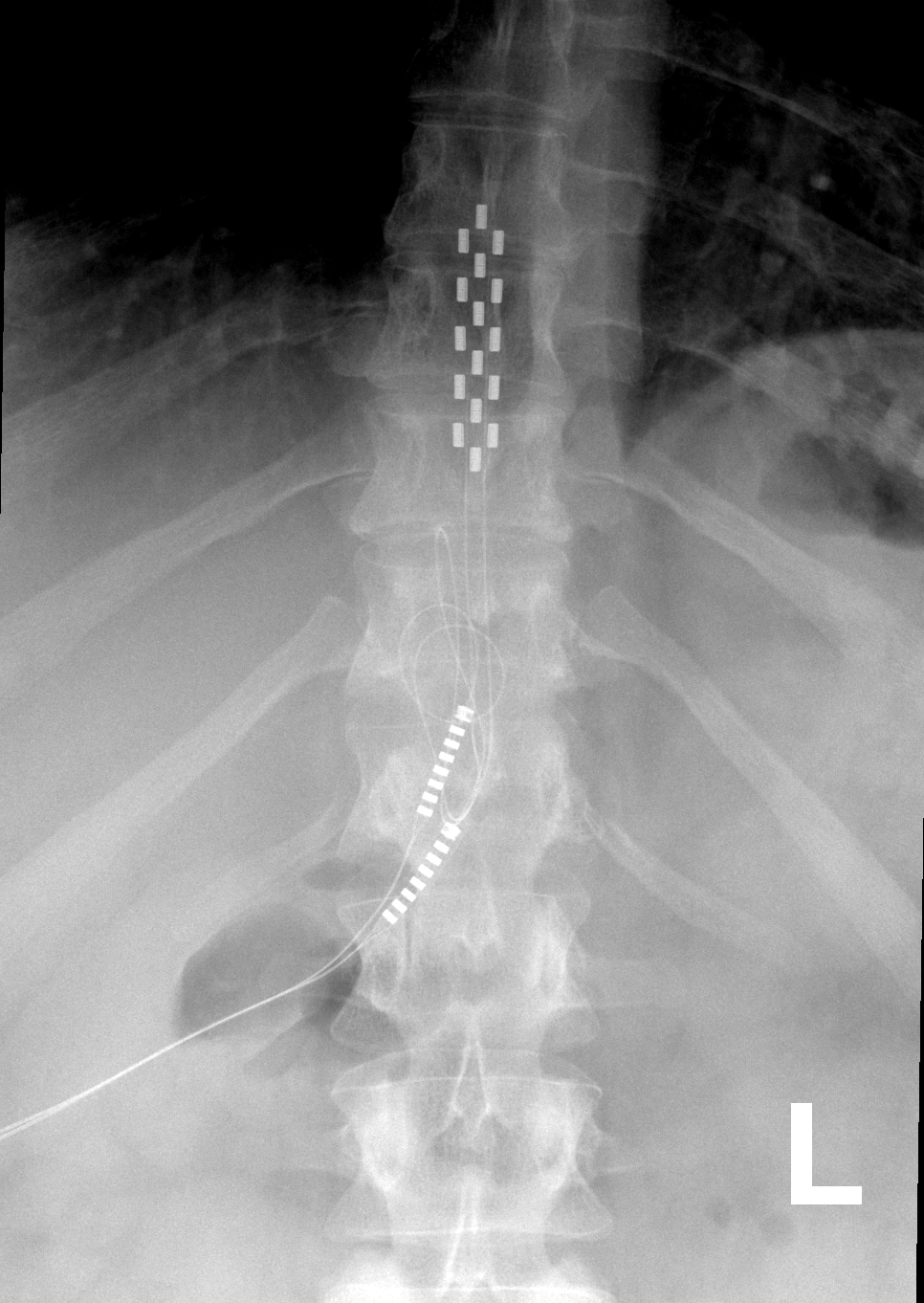
- Anterior view X-ray of a spinal cord stimulator (SCS) implanted in the thoracic spine

A spinal cord stimulator (SCS) or dorsal column stimulator (DCS) is a type of implantable neuromodulation device (sometimes called a "pain pacemaker") that is used to send electrical signals to select areas of the spinal cord (dorsal columns) for the treatment of certain pain conditions. SCS is a consideration for people who have a pain condition that has not responded to more conservative therapy. There are also spinal cord stimulators under research and development that could enable patients with spinal cord injury to walk again via epidural electrical stimulation (EES).

== Medical uses ==
The most common use of SCS is failed back surgery syndrome (FBSS) in the United States and peripheral ischemic pain in Europe.

As of 2014 the FDA had approved SCS as a treatment for FBSS, chronic pain, complex regional pain syndrome, intractable angina, as well as visceral abdominal and perineal pain and pain in the extremities from nerve damage.

Once a person has had a psychological evaluation and deemed an appropriate candidate for SCS, a temporary implant is placed, called a trial, to determine the best stimulation pattern, and the person is sent home for three to ten days with an external pulse generator. If pain control and increased activity was achieved, a permanent system, with leads and a pulse generator, is placed.

== Contraindications ==
SCS may be contraindicated in people who have coagulation related disorders, or are on anticoagulant therapy. Other contraindications include local and systemic infection, pacemakers, or those people for whom pre-surgical imaging studies show have anatomy that makes placement difficult, or if concerns arise during psychological evaluation.

== Adverse effects and complications ==
Complications with SCS range from simple easily correctable problems to devastating paralysis, nerve injury and death. In a 7-year follow-up, the overall complication rate was 5–18%. The most common complications include lead migration, lead breakage, and infection. Other complications include rotation of the pulse generator, haematomas (subcutaneous or epidural), cerebrospinal fluid (CSF) leak, post dural puncture headache, discomfort at pulse generator site, seroma and transient paraplegia.

Some people find the tingling sensation caused by older model SCS to be unpleasant.

The most common hardware related complication is lead migration, in which the implanted electrodes move from their original placement. With this complication, recapturing paraesthesia coverage can be attempted with reprogramming. In circumstances involving major lead migration a reoperation may be required to reset the lead placement. Studies differ greatly in reporting the percentage of people who have lead migration but the majority of studies report in the range of 10–25% of lead migration for spinal cord stimulation.

== Mechanism of action ==
The neurophysiological mechanisms of action of spinal cord stimulation are not completely understood but may involve masking pain sensation with tingling by altering the pain processing of the central nervous system. The mechanism of analgesia when SCS is applied in neuropathic pain states may be very different from that involved in analgesia due to limb ischemia. In neuropathic pain states, experimental evidence shows that SCS alters the local neurochemistry in dorsal horn, suppressing the hyperexcitability of the neurons. Specifically, there is some evidence for increased levels of GABA release, serotonin, and perhaps suppression of levels of some excitatory amino acids, including glutamate and aspartate. In the case of ischemic pain, analgesia seems to derive from restoration of the oxygen demand supply. This effect could be mediated by inhibition of the sympathetic system, although vasodilation is another possibility. It is also probable that a combination of the two above mentioned mechanisms is involved.

== Surgical procedure ==
Spinal cord stimulators are placed in two different stages: a trial stage followed by a final implantation stage. First, the skin is prepped and draped utilizing sterile technique. The epidural space is accessed with loss of resistance technique using a 14-gauge Tuohy needle. The lead is fed through carefully with fluoroscopic guidance to the appropriate spinal level. This process is repeated to place another lead adjacent to the first. Fluoroscopy is used often during the procedure to identify proper placement of the SCS leads. The lead placement depends on the patient's pain location. Based on previous studies, the lead placement for patients with low back pain is typically T9 to T10. The device technician will then turn on the stimulation, typically starting at a very low frequency. The patient is prompted to describe the sensation perceived by activation of the leads, and the technician will calibrate the SCS to achieve the maximum paresthesia coverage of the patient's targeted pain area. Finally, the leads are anchored externally to reduce risk of lead migration, the site is cleaned, and a clean dressing is applied. Once the patient has recovered from the procedure, the device is once again tested and programmed.

== Patient screening ==
Patients who are candidates for stimulator placement should be screened for contraindications and comorbidities. The following should be considered prior to stimulator trial:

- Risk of bleeding – Spinal cord stimulator trial and implant have been identified as procedures with high risk of serious intraspinal bleeding, which can cause permanent neurologic damage. Appropriate planning for discontinuation and reinstitution of anti-platelet and anticoagulant medications is necessary prior to placement of a stimulator.
- Psychological evaluation – Depression, anxiety, somatization, and hypochondriasis are associated with worse outcomes for spinal cord stimulators. Experts recommend psychological evaluation prior to placement. A diagnosis with a psychiatric disorder is not a strict contraindication to stimulator placement. However, treatment of the disorder prior to consideration of a trial placement is indicated.
- Delayed placement – Stimulators may have poor efficacy if placed many years after onset of chronic pain. One review of 400 cases found a success rate of only 9% for patients with stimulator placed over 15 years after onset of pain compared with nearly 85% for patients who received stimulators within two years of pain onset.
- Technical difficulty – Variations in anatomy, whether congenital or acquired, may preclude successful placement in certain individuals. Imaging of the spine is necessary to guide selection of candidates for whom spine surgery is more appropriate than stimulator placement.

== Trial period ==
In order to assess the efficacy of the spinal cord stimulator before implantation, a trial must be performed. This trial begins with placement of temporary leads into the epidural space and connected percutaneously to an external generator. The trial typically lasts 3–7 days followed by a 2-week reprieve before SCD implantation to ensure that there is no infection from the trial. Successful trial is defined by at least 50% reduction in pain and 80% paresthesia overlap of the original area of pain. If a patient has sudden changes in their pain, then further investigation is needed for possible lead migration or stimulator malfunction.

== History ==
Electrotherapy of pain by neurostimulation began shortly after Melzack and Wall proposed the gate control theory in 1965. This theory proposed that nerves carrying painful peripheral stimuli and nerves carrying touch and vibratory sensation both terminate in the dorsal horn (the gate) of spinal cord. It was hypothesized that input to the latter could be manipulated to "close the gate" to the former. As an application of the gate control theory, Shealy et al. implanted the first spinal cord stimulator device directly on the dorsal column for the treatment of chronic pain and in 1971, Shimogi and colleagues first reported the analgesic properties of epidural spinal cord stimulation. Since then this technique has undergone numerous technical and clinical developments.

At this time neurostimulation for the treatment of pain is used with nerve stimulation, spinal cord stimulation, deep brain stimulation, and motor cortex stimulation.

== Research ==
SCS has been studied in people with Parkinson's disease and angina pectoris.

Research on improving the devices and software has included efforts to increasing the battery life, efforts to develop closed loop control, and combining stimulation with implanted drug delivery systems.

SCS is being studied to treat spinal cord injury. In August 2018, The European Commission's Horizon 2020 Future and Emerging Technologies program announced a $3.5 million funding grant for the four-nation project team that is building a prototype of an implant designed to 'rewire' the spinal cord. In September 2018, Mayo Clinic and UCLA reported that spinal cord stimulation supported with physical therapy can help people with paralysis to regain their ability to stand and walk with assistance. In December 2019, the first double blinded, randomized controlled pivotal study in the history of spinal cord stimulation was published in Lancet Neurology.

== See also ==
- Transcutaneous electrical nerve stimulation
