= Discectomy =

Surgical removal of an intervertebral disc

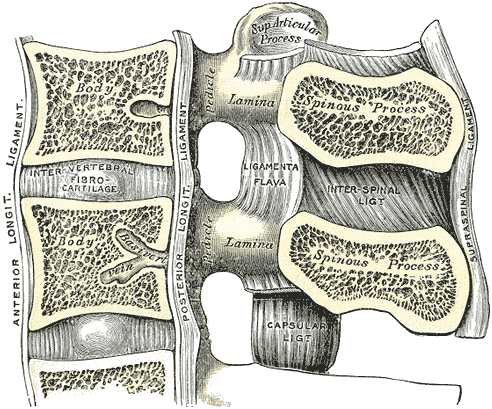
- Median sagittal section of two lumbar vertebrae and their ligaments. ("Intervertebral fibrocartilage", an old name for the intervertebral disc, labeled at center left.)
- ICD-9-CM: 80.51
- MeSH: D017586
- MedlinePlus: 007250

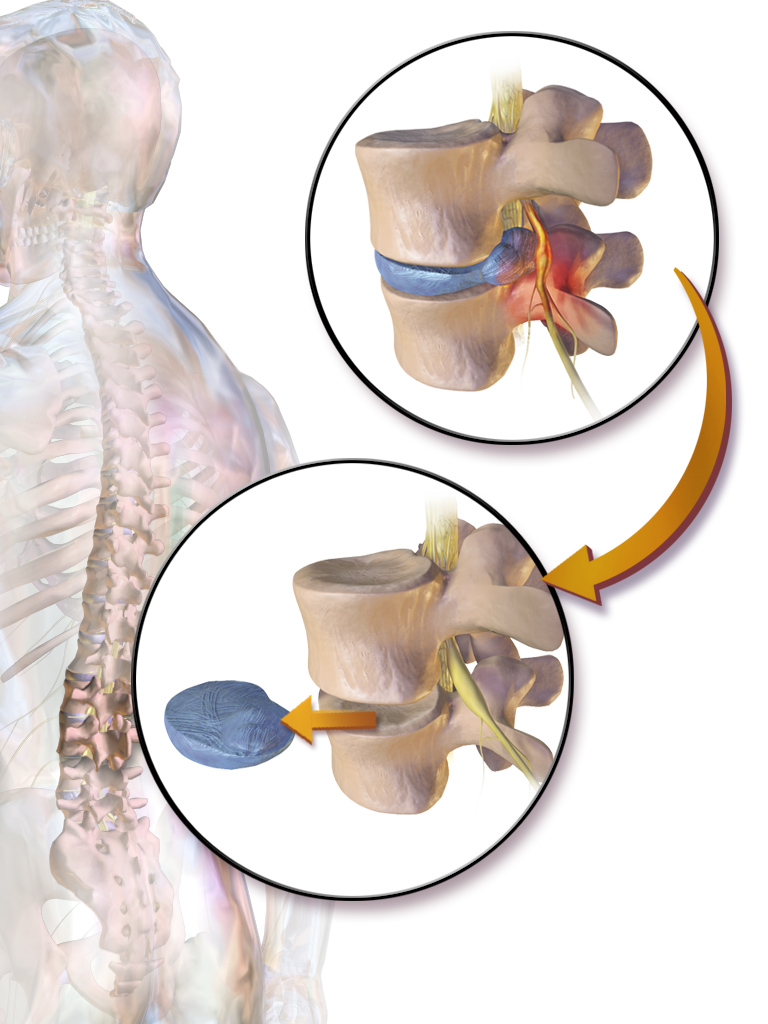
Illustration depicting a surgical discectomy

A discectomy (also called open discectomy, if done through a 1/2 inch or larger skin opening) is the surgical removal of abnormal disc material that presses on a nerve root or the spinal cord. The procedure involves removing a portion of an intervertebral disc, which causes pain, weakness or numbness by stressing the spinal cord or radiating nerves. The traditional open discectomy, or Love's technique, was published by Ross and Love in 1971. Advances have produced visualization improvements to traditional discectomy procedures (e.g. microdiscectomy, an open discectomy using an external microscope typically done through a 1-inch or larger skin opening), or endoscopic discectomy (the scope passes internally and typically done through a 2 mm skin opening or larger, up to 12 mm). In conjunction with the traditional discectomy or microdiscectomy, a laminotomy is often involved to permit access to the intervertebral disc. Laminotomy means a significant amount of typically normal bone (the lamina) is removed from the vertebra, allowing the surgeon to better see and access the area of disc herniation.

== Endoscopic discectomy ==
Small or ultra-small endoscopic discectomy (called Nano Endoscopic Discectomy) does not have internal cutting or bone removal and, due to the small size, is not called "open". These procedures do not cause post-laminectomy syndrome (failed back syndrome).

== Microdiscectomy ==
Microdiscectomy is a spine operation with a smaller incision than traditional discectomy, in which a portion of a herniated nucleus pulposus is removed by way of a surgical instrument, while using an external operating microscope for lighting and magnification. They may be "open", i.e., with a larger incision, or minimally invasive, i.e., with a 1.5 to 2.0 cm surgical incision.

=== Indications ===
Microdiscectomy may be a surgical option for patients with a single-level disc herniation and evidence of nerve root compression with residual unremitting radicular symptoms after failed conservative treatment. Cauda equina syndrome and progressive or new motor deficits are among the urgent surgical indications for microdiscectomy.

=== Contraindications ===
Contraindications include additional pathologies, including infection, tumor, or segmental instability or vertebral fracture where fusion or instrumentation may be required. However, segmental instability and spondylolisthesis may be considered relative contraindications by some physicians.

== Discectomy for athletes ==
Degeneration caused by years of repetitive mechanical stress can cause the disc of an athlete to be herniated. Lumbar disc herniation (LDH) is a critical injury for elite athletes that could cause extreme pain and significantly hinder performance. To relieve the pain, athletes usually go through microdiscectomy. However, the results of treatments in elite athletes differ due to the demand for optimal treatment, short recovery period, and high performance after the operation.

Most athletes return to their pre-surgery level after a discectomy. A systematic review of 450 athletes shows that 75–100% of athletes return to play after surgery. The average recovery period ranged from 2.8 to 8.7 months. Athletes recovered an average of 64.4% to 103.6% of their preoperative performance and had reported career longevity of 2.6 to 4.8 years post-return.

There are unsuccessful cases of discectomy for certain athletes like Tiger Woods, a world-famous PGA Tour golfer. Woods underwent three microdiscectomy procedures from 2014 to 2015 which failed to alleviate his pain. The removal of disc material due to discectomy meant that Woods eventually had to go through spinal fusion to recover.

== In the US ==
In the U.S., it has been estimated that the Medicare system spends over $300 million annually on lumbar discectomies.

== See also ==
- Back pain
- Anterior cervical discectomy and fusion
- Laminectomy
- Lumbar disc herniation
- Nerve compression syndrome
- Degenerative disc disease
- List of surgeries by type
- Intervetebral disc
- Vertebra
- Failed back surgery syndrome
- Cauda equina syndrome
- Nerve decompression
