= Disc protrusion =

Medical condition of the spine

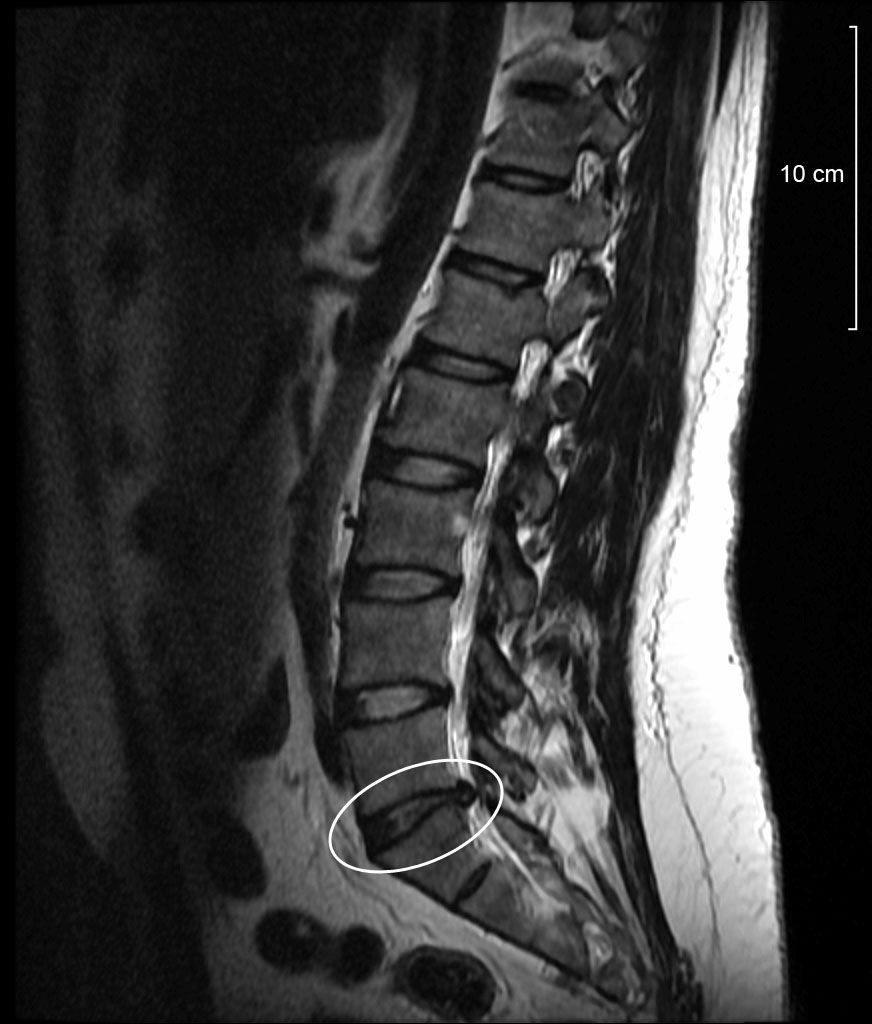
Spinal disc protrusion visible in MRI

A disc protrusion is a medical condition that can occur in some vertebrates, including humans, in which the outermost layers of the anulus fibrosus of the intervertebral discs of the spine are intact but bulge when one or more of the discs are under pressure.

Many disk abnormalities seen on MRI that are loosely referred to as "herniation" are actually just incidental findings. These may be unrelated to any symptoms and are just bulges of the anulus fibrosus. Jensen and colleagues, in an MRI study of the lumbar spine in 98 asymptomatic adults, found that in more than half, there was a symmetrical extension of a disc (or discs) beyond the margins of the interspace (bulging). In 27 percent, there was a focal or asymmetrical extension of the disc beyond the margin of the interspace (protrusion), and in only 1 percent was there more extreme extension of the disc (extrusion or sequestration). These findings emphasize the importance of using precise terms in describing the imaging abnormalities and evaluating them strictly in the context of the patient's symptoms.

A disc protrusion may progress to a spinal disc herniation, a condition in which there is a tear in the anulus fibrosus. The most common area to have a disc protrusion is in the Lumbar Spine, specifically L5.

== Treatment Options ==
There are a handful of different treatment options available, these can range from basic physical therapy to specific surgeries. Some disc protrusion may resolve on their own or with physical therapy within six weeks, which is why many prefer to start treatment with physical therapy and other non-invasive treatments. How treatment starts depends on how severe symptoms are .

=== Non-Invasive Treatment ===
Non-invasive treatment has a few layers to it. This may begin with physical therapy and oral medications, and move on to epidural injections. Within non-invasive treatment is also acupuncture and chiropractic specialty. Epidural injections are often a go to for doctors when they see patients who have chronic lumbar back pain, these injections go into the epidural space of the spinal column and reduce irritation to nerve roots, which reduces pain while the disc continues to heal on its own, though these types of injections are only considered after others have failed, such as physical therapy, exercise, and medication

=== Invasive Treatment ===
Invasive treatment mostly includes surgery, and there are a few different operations that a doctor may suggest depending on the nature and severity of the injury. One of the common surgeries performed is called a Microdiscectomy, during this surgery the injured tissue of the intervertebral disc, ligament, and possibly bone is removed in order to alleviate pressure on nerve roots, this procedures is mainly for pain relief.
