= Asporin =

Protein-coding gene in the species Homo sapiens

ASPN

Identifiers
- Aliases: ASPN, OS3, PLAP-1, PLAP1, SLRR1C, asporin, Asporin
- External IDs: OMIM: 608135; MGI: 1913945; GeneCards: ASPN

Gene location (Mouse)
Chr.	Chromosome 13 (mouse)
Band	13|13 A5	Start	49,697,919 bp
Band	13|13 A5	End	49,721,041 bp
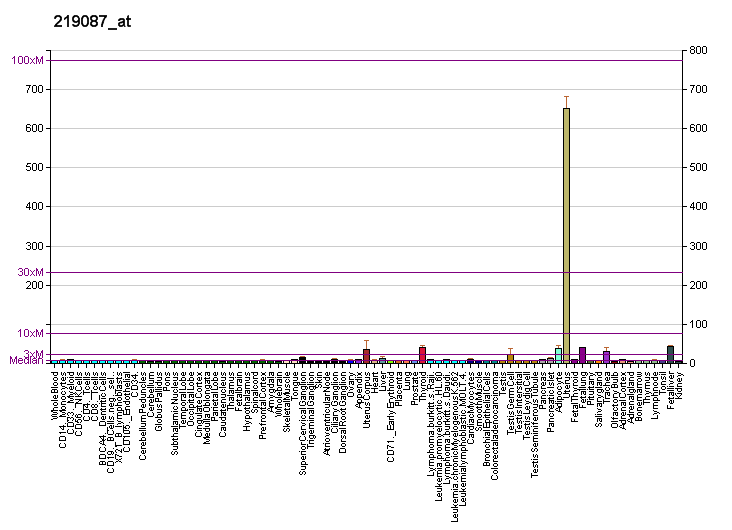
RNA expression pattern
Bgee	Human / Mouse (ortholog); Top expressed in: synovial joint; periodontal fiber; Achilles tendon; saphenous vein; visceral pleura; right coronary artery; ascending aorta; vena cava; gallbladder; left coronary artery / Top expressed in: body of femur; calvaria; dermis; intercostal muscle; umbilical cord; skin of external ear; efferent ductule; soleus muscle; lumbar spinal ganglion; ankle; More reference expression data
BioGPS	More reference expression data
Gene ontology
Molecular function	calcium ion binding; protein kinase inhibitor activity; collagen binding; extracellular matrix structural constituent conferring compression resistance
Cellular component	cytoplasm; extracellular matrix; extracellular region; collagen-containing extracellular matrix
Biological process	bone mineralization; biomineral tissue development; negative regulation of transforming growth factor beta receptor signaling pathway; negative regulation of tooth mineralization; negative regulation of protein kinase activity; cytokine-mediated signaling pathway; negative regulation of receptor signaling pathway via JAK-STAT
Sources:Amigo / QuickGO
Orthologs
Databases	NCBI: entry
Species	Human	Mouse
Entrez	54829	66695
Ensembl	n/a	ENSMUSG00000021388
UniProt	Q9BXN1	Q99MQ4
RefSeq (mRNA)	NM_017680; NM_001193335	NM_001172481; NM_025711
RefSeq (protein)	NP_001180264; NP_060150	NP_001165952; NP_079987
Location (UCSC)	n/a	Chr 13: 49.7 – 49.72 Mb
PubMed search
- Wikidata
View/Edit Human	View/Edit Mouse

Asporin is a protein that in humans is encoded by the ASPN gene.

== Function ==
ASPN belongs to a family of leucine-rich repeat (LRR) proteins associated with the cartilage matrix. The name asporin reflects the unique aspartate-rich N terminus and the overall similarity to decorin (MIM 125255) (Lorenzo et al., 2001).
