= Epidural steroid injection =

Medical treatment

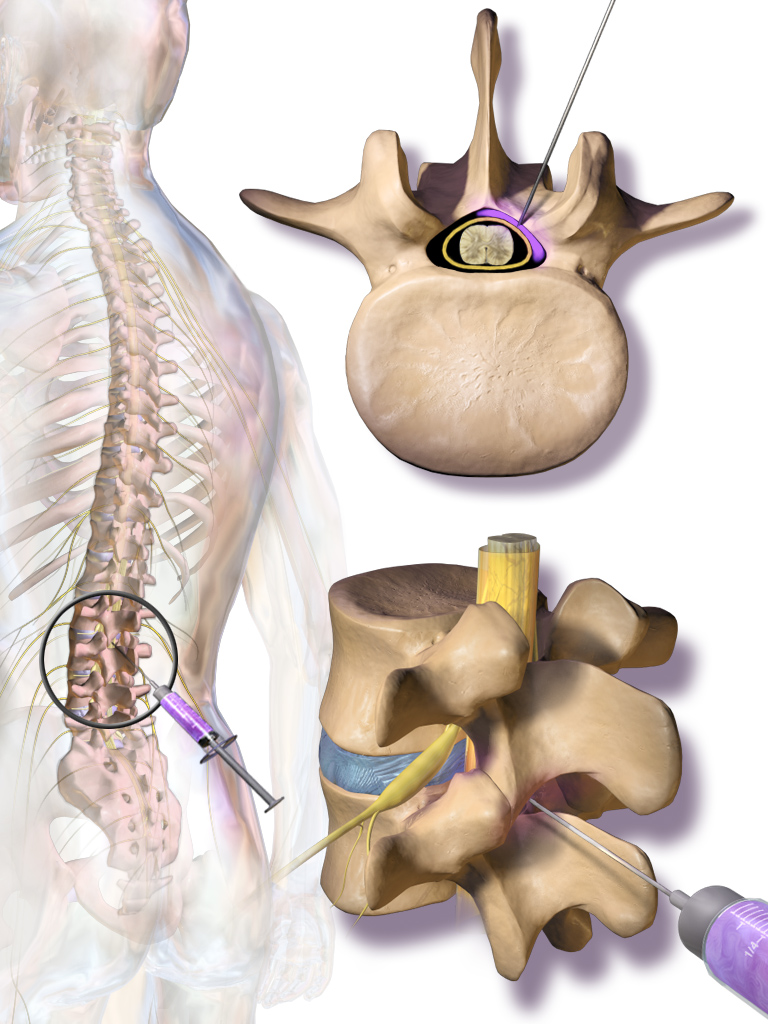
- Steroids are injected into the cerebrospinal fluid in the canal surrounding the spine. Nerves branch out from the spine. The nerve roots, which may be compressed, are at the base of the nerves.
- Specialty: Pain medicine

Epidural steroid injection (ESI) is a technique in which corticosteroids and a local anesthetic are injected into the epidural space around the spinal cord in an effort to improve spinal stenosis, spinal disc herniation, or both. It is of limited benefit but has infrequent major side effects. The Food and Drug Administration (FDA) has not approved ESI for pain management, and has raised concerns about rare, but serious, side effects.

== Medical uses ==
Epidural steroid injection for sciatica and spinal stenosis is of unclear effect. The evidence to support use in the cervical spine is not very good. When medical imaging is not used to determine the proper spot for injection, ESI benefits appear to be of short-term benefit when used in sciatica. It is unclear if ESI is useful for chronic pain after spinal surgery.

== Steroid effectiveness ==
Steroids are included in ESI based on the belief that steroids reduce inflammation, but clinical practice has indicated that steroids plus lidocaine (anesthetic) produces no greater reduction in pain than lidocaine alone. The fact that there is no association between quantity of steroid and reported pain reduction has caused speculation of a placebo effect for steroids.

== Side effects ==
Major side effects are rare. These include loss of vision, stroke, paralysis, or death when the corticosteroids are infected, as in a 2012 meningitis outbreak. Another study found an increased odds of developing epidural lipomatosis, independent of body mass index (BMI) or other factors.

Locally injected glucocorticoids can have systemic effects, including loss of bone mineral density, suppression of the immune system as well as effects on the central nervous system and cardiovascular system.

== Technique ==
Elective spinal injections should be performed with imaging guidance, such as fluoroscopy or the use of a radiocontrast agent, unless that guidance is contraindicated. Imaging guidance ensures the correct placement of the needle and maximizes the physician's ability to make an accurate diagnosis and administer effective therapy. Without imaging, the risk increases for the injection to be incorrectly placed, and this would in turn lower the therapy's efficacy and increase subsequent risk of need for more treatment.

Epidural steroid injections can be given in different areas of the spine, which include the lower back (lumbar), neck (cervical), or mid-back (thoracic).

The way the needle is inserted can vary. It can be interlaminar, which means it's placed between the lamina (the protective layers of the spine). It can be transforaminal, meaning it's inserted across the foramen (the openings on the sides of your vertebrae where the nerves exit). Or it can be caudal, which means it's inserted through the sacrum (the large, triangular bone at the base of the spine).
