= Minimally invasive spine surgery =

- Specialty: Orthopedic surgeon, neurosurgeon

Minimally invasive spine surgery (MISS) has no specific, universally agreed-upon definition among surgeons and clinical scientists. It implies a lack of severe surgical invasion. The older style of open-spine surgery for a relatively small disc problem used to require a 5-6 inch incision and a month in the hospital, and even procedures done with a microscope require skin openings of approximately one inch, or more.

Modern endoscopic procedures can be done through a 2 to 5 mm skin opening. Modern MISS techniques and technology, such as advanced imaging and specialized medical equipment, can reduce incision size, tissue trauma, bleeding, and radiation exposure, as well as minimizing hospital stays and infection risks. The main goal is to reduce blood loss and tissue damage, and to keep bone/tissue architecture intact.

MISS can be used to treat a number of spinal conditions such as degenerative disc disease, disc herniation, fractures, tumors, infections, instability, and deformity. It also makes spine surgery possible for patients who were previously considered too high-risk for traditional surgery due to previous medical history or the complexity of the condition.

== History ==
Humans have been trying to treat spinal pain for at least 5,000 years. The first evidence of spine surgery appeared in Egyptian mummies buried in 3,000 BC. However, Hippocrates is often credited with being the father of spine surgery due to the extensive amount of writing and proposed treatments he produced on the topic. The first operative spine surgery is credited to Paul of Aegina, who lived during the 7th century.

Historically, open surgical approaches entailed large incisions and extensive tissue manipulation that were associated with prolonged recovery times and considerable postoperative pain. In response to these limitations, the medical community began exploring surgical techniques that would spare the paraspinous musculature and minimize trauma. However, only within the last 50 years have advances in digital fluoroscopy, image guidance, endoscopy and minimally invasive surgical tools allowed minimally invasive spine surgery to rise to the forefront of spinal procedures.

Philadelphia surgeon Parviz Kambin is considered one of the earliest MISS pioneers, introducing the percutaneous discectomy in 1973 and, later, identifying the "Kambin triangle" – the safe corridor into the lumbar disc between the exiting nerve root and the superior facet – which facilitated the posterolateral approach.

During the late 20th century, innovations such as operative microscopes, tubular retractors, and endoscopic systems laid the groundwork for MISS. Over time, the integration of advanced imaging modalities—such as intraoperative X-ray, CT scanning, and later, robotic navigation systems—further refined these techniques. This progress has expanded the spectrum of spine conditions treatable with minimally invasive methods, including facet arthropathy herniated disc, radiculopathy, sciatica, spinal fracture, spinal stenosis, spondylolisthesis, and spondylolysis.

In October 2000, the FDA approved an endoscopic spinal fusion device developed by Endius (now part of Zimmer Biomet), allowing surgeons to perform a spinal fusion procedure through two small incisions. The device utilizes a narrow tube to move muscle tissue aside, enabling direct visualization of the spine through a built-in camera. Charles Goodwin at Hospital for Special Surgery was the first U.S. surgeon to use the technique. The conventional spinal fusion patients lost 800 to 1,200 cc of blood, while the endoscopic surgical patients lost less than 30 cc of blood. Patients were also able to get out of bed the day after surgery.

In the 2010s, hospitals began to move away from large structural autografts, favoring synthetic implants like 3D-printed cages tailored to individual anatomy. Titanium implants were popular for their bone integration properties. Concerns about imaging titanium artifacts remained persistent, prompting interest in porous titanium and newer forms of polyetheretherketone (PEEK) cages.

== Methods ==
Traditionally, spine surgery has required surgeons to create a 5-6 inch incision down the affected portion of the spine and to pull back the tissue and muscle using retractors in order to reveal the bone. The wound itself takes a long time to heal; the aim of minimally invasive surgery is reduce tissue trauma and the associated bleeding and risk of infection by minimizing the size of the incision.

Some minimally invasive spine surgery may be performed by a spinal neurosurgeon or an orthopedic surgeon and a trained medical team. Typically, they will begin the operation by delivering a type of anesthesia, known as regional anesthesia that numbs a particular part of the body in conjunction with sedation or simply give a general anesthesia that prevents pain and allows the patient to sleep throughout the surgery.

Next, the surgeon may begin taking continuous X-ray images in real time, a process called fluoroscopy, of the affected portion of the spine. This allows them to see what they're operating on, in real-time, throughout the surgery without creating a large incision.

At this point, the surgeon may begin performing the operation, by creating an incision in the skin above the affected portion of the spine and then using a device called an obturator to push the underlying tissue apart; the obturator is inside a tube, which is left behind after the obturator is removed, leaving a channel down to the spine. Small operating tools as well as cameras and a light are used through this tube. In other surgeries this is called a trocar; in spine surgery it is called a "tubular retractor."

The surgeon makes the necessary repairs to the spine, extracting affected disc material out through the tubular retractor and inserting medical devices, such as intervertebral spacers, rods, pedicle screws, facet screws, nucleus replacement devices, and artificial discs, through the retractor.

Robot-assisted surgery is occasionally used in minimally invasive spine surgery.

When the procedure is done the tube is removed, and the wound is stitched, stapled, or glued shut.

== Procedures ==
MISS uses a variety of techniques, each developed to provide the most direct access to the pathological site while minimizing collateral damage. These approaches can avoid disruption of the posterior musculature while still permitting adequate visualization and instrumentation placement.

Posterior approach

This traditional route is adapted for minimally invasive interventions by using dilators and tubular retractors to create a "working corridor" through the muscles. Techniques such as minimally invasive decompressive laminectomy and microdiscectomy are commonly performed via this approach.

Anterior approaches

For certain procedures, such as interbody fusion, the surgeon might access the spine from the front.

Lateral approaches

For certain procedures, such as interbody fusion, the surgeon might access the spine from the side.

Endoscopic techniques

Endoscopic spine surgery employs a camera and specialized instruments inserted through a minimal incision, offering real-time, magnified views of the spine. This approach is particularly useful for the removal of herniated disc fragments and for decompression procedures.

=== Specific procedures ===
Many spinal procedures make use of minimally invasive techniques. They can involve cutting away tissue (discectomy), fixing adjacent vertebrae to one another (spinal fusion), and replacing bone or other tissue. The main philosophy is least bloods, tissue damage, and keep bone/tissue architecture. The name of the procedure often includes the region of the spine that is operated on, including cervical spine, thoracic spine, or lumbar spine. These procedures include:

- Anterior cervical discectomy and fusion (ACDF)
- Anterior cervical discectomy
- Artificial disc replacement or total disc replacement
- Epidural lysis of adhesions, also known as percutaneous adhesiolysis or the Racz procedure
- Laminectomy
- Laminotomy
- Oblique lateral lumbar inter body fusion (OLLIF)
- Percutaneous vertebroplasty
- Endoscopic Discectomy
- Percutaneous stenoscopic lumbar decompression
- Lateral lumbar interbody fusion (LLIF)
- Microsurgical lumbar laminoplasty
- Minimally invasive posterior lumbar interbody fusion (MI-PLIF)
- Minimally invasive transforaminal lumbar interbody fusion (MI-TLIF)
- Endoscopic microdiscectomy
- Percutaneous transforaminal endoscopic discectomy (PTED)
- Transforaminal lumbar interbody fusion (TLIF)

Small or ultra-small endoscopic discectomy (nano-endoscopic discectomy, or endoscopic transforaminal lumbar discectomy and reconfiguration) does not have bone removal, like laminectomy or laminotomy. These procedures do not cause post-laminectomy syndrome (failed back syndrome).

== Risks and benefits ==
Risks include damage to nerves or muscles, a cerebrospinal fluid leak, and typical surgical risks, such as infection or a failure to resolve the condition that prompted the surgery.

Claims are made that the larger style of MISS has better outcomes than open surgery with respect to fewer complications and shorter hospital stays, but data supporting those claims is non-conclusive.

== See also ==
- Minimally invasive thoracic spinal fusion
