= Spinal decompression =

Relief of pressure on the spinal cord or compressed nerve roots

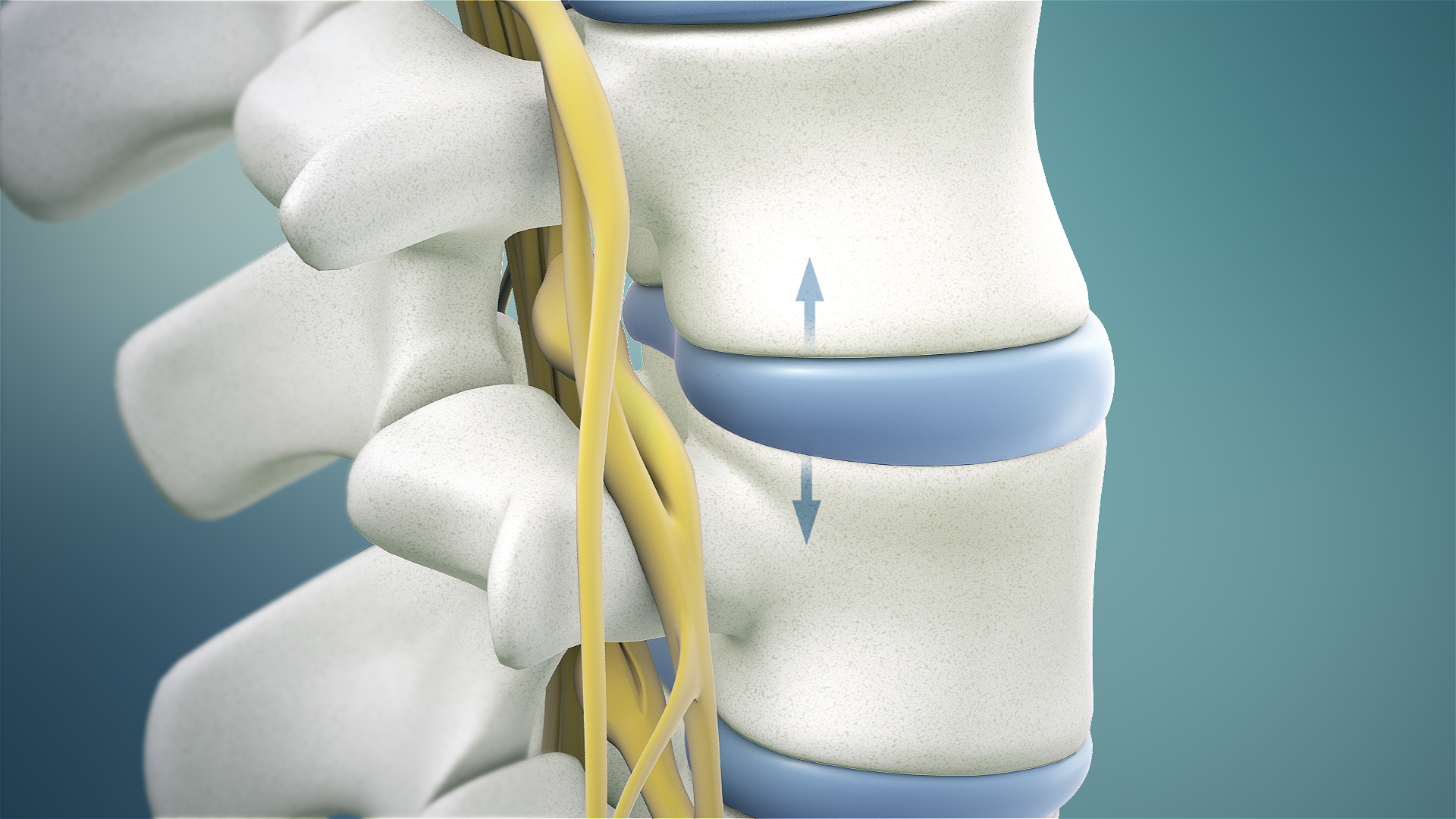
Spinal decompression is the procedure which reduces pressure on the spinal cord.

Spinal decompression is the relief of pressure on the spinal cord or on one or more compressed nerve roots passing through or exiting the spinal column. Decompression of the spinal neural elements is a key component in treating spinal radiculopathy, myelopathy and claudication.

== Surgical methods ==
=== Decompression of nerve roots ===
When a single spinal nerve root is compressed, the resulting clinical outcome is termed radiculopathy, and is usually labeled according to the specific nerve root compressed (hence, compression of the nerve root exiting the spinal column below the left-sided pedicle of the L5 vertebra will be diagnosed as "left L5 radiculopathy").

Microdiscectomy (or microdecompression) is a minimally invasive surgical procedure in which a portion of a herniated nucleus pulposus is removed by way of a surgical instrument. The purpose of this procedure is to relieve the pressure and reduce the local inflammatory reaction around a nerve root, caused by the herniated nucleus pulposus.

=== Decompression of the spinal cord or cauda equina ===
Laminectomy is an open or minimally invasive surgical procedure in which a portion of the posterior arch of the vertebrae and/or spinal ligaments is removed from the spine to alleviate the pressure on the spinal canal contents. This procedure is usually performed when decompression of more than one nerve root is needed. In the lumbar spine, it is commonly used to treat spinal claudication caused by spinal stenosis, and is considered the most effective treatment for this condition based on current evidence. In the cervical and thoracic spine it is used to treat myelopathy caused by compression of the spinal cord itself.

== Non-surgical methods ==
=== Physiotherapy ===
Traction is offered as a non-surgical method of spinal decompression. A 2021 meta-analysis showed physiotherapy was an effective method of managing prolapsed lumbar intervertebral discs; but was unable to establish the source of the pain relief reported.

=== Mechanical traction ===
Mechanical traction decompression has been shown to be superior to conventional physical therapy (physiotherapy) in the short term (weeks), but not in all long-term (over 6 months) studies.

=== Nucleoplasty ===
Nucleoplasty is the removal of tissue from the nucleus pulposus using a bipolar radiofrequency device. Nucleoplasty reduces patient pain and increases patient mobility, with a minimally invasive procedure having few complications.

== See also ==
- Microsurgical lumbar laminoplasty
- Nerve decompression
