= Chinese Cultural Centre =

Chinese Cultural Centre may refer to:

== Places ==
- Chinese Cultural Centre, Calgary
- Chinese Cultural Centre, Vancouver
- Chinese Cultural Center, Phoenix
