= Sam Chu Lin =

American journalist (c. 1939–2005)

- Born: c. 1939; Greenville, Mississippi, U.S.
- Died: March 5, 2006 (aged 66–67); Burbank, California, U.S.
- Education: Michigan State University (B.A.)
- Occupation: Journalist
- Spouse: Judy Chu Lin
- Children: 2

Sam Chu Lin (Chinese: 趙帝恩; pinyin: Zhào Dì'ēn; Jyutping: Ziu6 Dai3 Jan1; c. 1939 – March 5, 2006) was an American journalist.

== Career and contributions ==
Born in Greenville, Mississippi, Sam Chu Lin began his career in broadcasting began when he hosted a 1956 radio show in his hometown. He used the name "Sammy Lin," which helped him as many people did not identify this name with an Asian. He later became known for his deep baritone voice. He had wanted to speak without his Southern twang and practiced by listening late at night to CBS Radio's Edward R. Murrow. Chu Lin's hard work and dedication brought him to Phoenix, New York City, San Francisco, and finally Los Angeles.

In the 1960s, Chu Lin led the way for Chinese Americans in broadcast journalism, being one of only three Asian Americans. He was one of the first Asian Americans to appear on both radio and (in 1968) television, eventually working for all four major broadcast networks. He first reached a national audience with CBS News in New York.

Chu Lin believed that journalism should be educational, and that "informing and helping others is what makes journalism exciting." He felt that journalism was a "chance to use your roots for a positive purpose."

He was a frequent contributor to Asian American publications such as AsianWeek and Rafu Shimpo, as well as popular newspapers such as the San Francisco Examiner and the Los Angeles Times.

In 1975, Chu Lin was the first CBS reporter to broadcast nationally the news about the fall of Saigon and the end of the Vietnam War. He was also in Beijing for the Tiananmen Square protests of 1989.

He fought to produce documentaries about Asian Americans, including a program on titled Asian American-When Your Neighbor Looks Like the Enemy on ABC's "Nightline." Stewart Kwoh, executive director and president of the Asian Pacific American Legal Center, said in a statement, "He was a reporter who went the extra 10 miles to make sure people knew who their Asian neighbors were."

His last broadcast news position before his death was as a freelancer for KTTV (Fox affiliate, Los Angeles), a position he held since 1995.

His last published article is a feature story on efforts to preserve Phoenix's Sun Mercantile Building, dated March 3, 2006.

U.S. Secretary of Transportation and former Congressman, Norman Mineta, said of Chu Lin's decades-long career,

Throughout his career, Sam stood strong against discrimination and helped break down negative stereotypes, all the while conducting himself with a great amount of integrity, credibility, and enthusiasm. Sam was proud of his Chinese American heritage. He wasn't shy about using his roots to make the entire Asian American community, and indeed the world, a better place, and today thanks in part to Sam, doors and minds that were once shut to Asian Americans are now open and accepting.

== Personal life and death ==
The Chu Lin last name only goes back two generations because when his grandfather came to the United States, immigration authorities mistakenly combined his given and last names. This was the beginning of the Chu-Lin/Chulin/Chu Lin family in America.

Sam died at the age of 67 in Burbank, California. He became ill at Bob Hope Airport in Burbank after flying in from Phoenix and was taken to a local hospital where he was pronounced dead. Sam is survived by his wife and two sons.

== Awards ==
During his lifetime, Chu Lin won various awards for his reporting and community service, and produced stories on the history of Asians in the U.S. for ABC and NBC. His television documentary, Chu Lin Is an Old American Name, which told the story of the Chinese American experience through one family's experiences, won a National Headliner Award from the Press Club of Atlantic City in New Jersey.

Other awards include: the Golden Mike Award; Community Achievement Award from the Los Angeles chapter of the Organization of Chinese Americans; Lifetime Achievement Award from the Asian American Journalists Association; 2005, Spirit of America Award, Chinese American Citizens Alliance; 2006, Asian Legacy Award from Asian Business Association.

He also won numerous awards from the Associated Press, United Press International, the Press Club of Los Angeles, and the Radio and Television News Association.
