= Xenco Medical =

American medical technology company

- Founded: 2011
- Founder: Jason Haider
- Headquarters: San Diego, CA
- Website: xencomedical.com

Xenco Medical is an American medical technology company headquartered in San Diego, California that designs, develops, and distributes composite polymer medical devices.

== History ==
Xenco Medical was founded in 2011 to replace traditional metal surgical systems and their cost-prohibitive manufacturing process with the first disposable, composite polymer spinal surgery systems. After identifying both the inconsistent performance of steel implant systems and their susceptibility to pathogen transmission as critical health care challenges, Xenco Medical began a three-year process of research and development to create an entirely disposable, sterile packaged surgical implant system made from reinforced plastic, rather than steel.

On July 17, 2015, Xenco Medical announced that the UCLA Spine Center had successfully performed spine surgery using the world's first disposable, plastic surgical rasps and implant inserter. The UCLA surgery, an Anterior Cervical Discectomy and Fusion surgery, took place on July 13, 2015 and was the first use of Xenco Medical's plastic system at a major U.S. hospital. It was reported that at the completion of the UCLA surgery, Xenco Medical's single-use system was disposed of, eliminating the risk of infection due to reused, improperly sterilized instruments.

== SET^{x} Technology ==
On September 30, 2015, The UCSF Orthopedic Trauma Institute released its findings from a comparative strength study involving a disposable, plastic spinal instrument by Xenco Medical and an exact counterpart made from metal. The strength study, which was performed at UCSF, found that the plastic lumbar instrument by Xenco Medical significantly outperformed the metal counterpart in maintaining structural integrity. The report by UCSF states "At 40mm of cantilever deflection, the composite polymer instrument showed no visible fracture while the aluminum instrument exhibited significant deformation." Xenco Medical's patient-specific implant systems are reported to eliminate the costs associated with the autoclave process, the delivery and retrieval process, surgery postponement due to sterilization errors and extended care due to infections. Xenco Medical's composite polymer instrumentation was noted for being a consistently-calibrated alternative to the surgical systems that fail after being used repeatedly in hundreds of patients.

News of Xenco Medical's expansion offered that the strength of the devices is derived from the unique nature of the interfacial bond in the company's reinforced, composite polymer devices. The SETx Technology couples the crystallinity of polyamides and the strength of various durable compounds into a highly durable fibrous matrix. Coverage of Xenco Medical's devices has noted that their capability to withstand high loads of force is attributable to the company's use of materials science in the design process

== The ASC CerviKit ==
In July 2017, the nationwide expansion of Xenco Medical's compact ASC delivery platform for the company's disposable Anterior Cervical Discectomy and Fusion (ACDF) system was reported. It was reported that the ASC CerviKit was developed for ambulatory surgery centers and included all of Xenco Medical's single-use cervical implant families. Becker's reported that Xenco Medical designed the lightweight ASC CerviKit to streamline the ACDF procedure and address the space constraints in surgery centers. The platform includes Xenco Medical's pre-loaded cervical interbodies and pre-loaded cervical plates as well as the supporting, single-use instruments. Mention of Xenco Medical's ASC CerviKit was contextualized as part of a larger movement in healthcare towards streamlined care. It was reported that the ASC CerviKit includes Xenco Medical's Merge Cervical Plate system, a single-use platform using the company's Snap-Align technology.

== Surgical Vending Machine ==
In June 2019, Medical Device and Diagnostics Industry News reported on Xenco Medical's launch of the first surgical vending machine for spine surgery instruments and implants. The news outlet reported that the Xenco Medical surgical vending machine is equipped with wifi, a touchscreen, and that it uses an advanced elevator-based system to retrieve each sterile-packaged system. Reportedly, each machine can hold up to 260 Xenco Medical boxes, and the machines can be customized to meet the needs of each hospital. Orthopaedic Design and Technology magazine reported that the vending machines also feature virtual tutorials for Xenco Medical products with a virtual assistant named Ezra. Medgadget reported that the Xenco machine dispenses pre-packaged sterile devices that are ready to ago as soon as they're properly opened in the OR. It was reported that real-time inventory alerts are sent from the machine to Xenco Medical headquarters to track inventory levels.

== CancelleX Titanium Foam Implants ==
Xenco announced the nationwide launch of its CancelleX titanium foam spinal implants in June 2020. Interesting Engineering reported that the sponge-like implant is designed to promote bone apposition and facilitate vascularization and that it has the ability produce capillary action through its structure. Medical Design and Outsourcing News reported that the Xenco Medical spinal implants are injection-molded titanium foam and are pre-attached to disposable, composite polymer instruments. It was reported that the Xenco titanium foam implants feature interconnected porosity throughout each implant.

== TrabeculeX Continuum ==
In 2024, TechTimes reported on Xenco Medical’s unveiling of the TrabeculeX Continuum at the 2024 Consumer Electronics Show (CES) in Las Vegas, Nevada. In July of 2024, Fast Company Magazine awarded the TrabeculeX Continuum by Xenco Medical the prestigious Innovation by Design Award. According to Biospace, the TrabeculeX Continuum by Xenco Medical is the first reported technology-enabled bridge between orthobiologics and digital health, unifying a patient’s biomaterial implantation and postoperative journey. Orthopedic Design and Technology magazine reported that the bridging technology consisted of a regenerative biomaterial engineered to conduct 3D bone formation with surface topography design at the sub-micron scale and a linked remote therapeutic monitoring TrabeculeX recovery app for virtual physical therapy and asynchronous video and text messaging. According to Medical Plastics News, Xenco Medical developed the TrabeculeX Continuum to create a seamless, uninterrupted link from surgery to full mobility that dissolved the otherwise siloed nature of modern surgical care.

== Awards and recognition ==
In April of 2026, Time Magazine named Xenco Medical one of the TIME 100 Most Influential Companies in the World and the winner of the 2026 Time Impact Award in Health. In June of 2026, Xenco Medical was named the winner of the 2026 Fast Company Magazine World Changing Ideas Award. In September of 2025, Xenco Medical was named the 2025 Medical Device/Diagnostics Company of the Year at the Trailblazer Awards in New York City. In March of 2025, Xenco Medical was named one of the World's Most Innovative Companies by Fast Company Magazine for the second time. In July 2024, Fast Company Magazine awarded Xenco Medical a 2024 Innovation by Design Award for the TrabeculeX Continuum. In June 2024, Inc. Magazine named Xenco Medical one of the best companies to work for in America.In March 2023, Xenco Medical was named as one of the World’s Most Innovative Companies by Fast Company Magazine.In December 2022, the World Economic Forum named Xenco Medical the winner of the 2022 New Champions Award for Excellence in Sustainable Growth. In 2024, 2023, and 2022, the San Diego Business Journal named Xenco Medical Founder and CEO Jason Haider as one of the Top 50 Life Science Leaders in San Diego. In 2026, Jason Haider was named one of the Top Healthcare Leaders of Influence by the San Diego Business Journal. In 2021, The San Diego Business Journal named Haider as one of the 500 Most Influential People in San Diego.
