= Chinese Cultural Center, Phoenix =

Defunct cultural center in Arizona (1998–2018)

Chinese Cultural Center
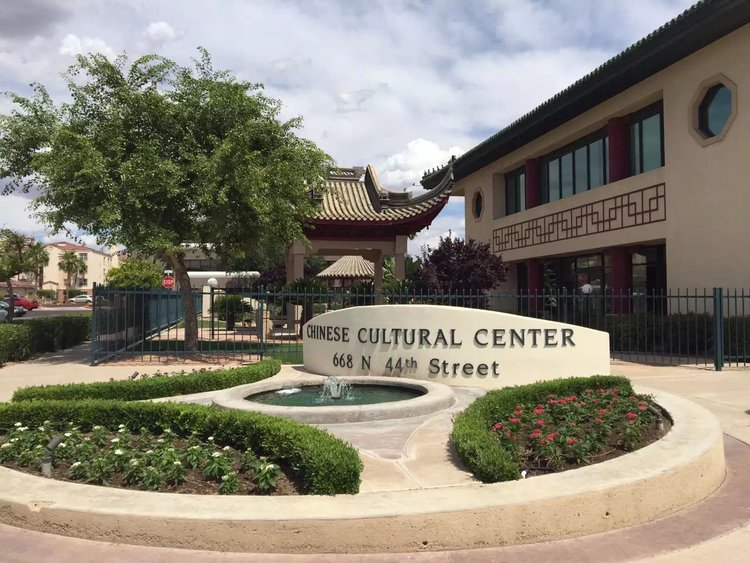
- The center in April 2017
- Location: Phoenix, Arizona, U.S.
- Coordinates: 33.4551°N 111.9885°W
- Address: 669 N. 44th Street
- Opened: December 1998
- Closed: 2018
- Developer: BNU Corporation, a subsidiary of COFCO
- Owner: COFCO
- Architect: Cornoyer-Hedrick
- Num. of anchor tenants: 1
- Floor area: 160,000 sq ft (15,000 m^{2})
- Floors: 2
- Public transit: Valley Metro

Chinese name
- Traditional Chinese: 鳳凰城中國文化中心
- Simplified Chinese: 凤凰城中国文化中心
- Literal meaning: Phoenix Chinese Cultural Center
Transcriptions
Standard Mandarin
- Hanyu Pinyin: Fènghuángchéng Zhōngguó Wénhuà Zhōngxīn
Yue: Cantonese
- Jyutping: Fung^{6}wong^{4}sing^{4} Zung^{1}gwok^{3} Man^{4}faa^{3} Zung^{1}sam^{1}

The Chinese Cultural Center (Chinese: 鳳凰城中國文化中心), now the Outlier Center, was a Chinese-themed retail complex in Phoenix, Arizona. It was developed in 1997 by BNU Corporation, a subsidiary of COFCO, a Chinese state-run enterprise and the country's largest food processor, manufacturer and trader. Although the center was developed as a for-profit investment by its owners, it was portrayed as a "cultural center" for the Chinese community in the greater Phoenix area. The developers thought the traditional Chinese architecture and landscaping, its concentration of Chinese-related businesses, and its use as a venue for celebrating Chinese holidays would attract both tourists and local Asian-Americans, and make Chinese business people feel more at home and welcome in Phoenix, thus helping Phoenix attract more foreign investment. The center opened in 1998 with visual elements imported from China and installed by Chinese craftsmen. It struggled with low occupancy, suffered further during the recession of the mid-2000s, and never recovered. In 2017, a new owner announced the property would be repurposed as a modern office building and the distinctive Chinese roof would be removed. This led to a sustained multi-year effort by the Chinese-American community to block the redevelopment and preserve the center as it was built. Despite demonstrations, petitions, lobbying, and several lawsuits, the new owner ultimately prevailed and most of the Chinese elements were gone by 2022.

== Background ==
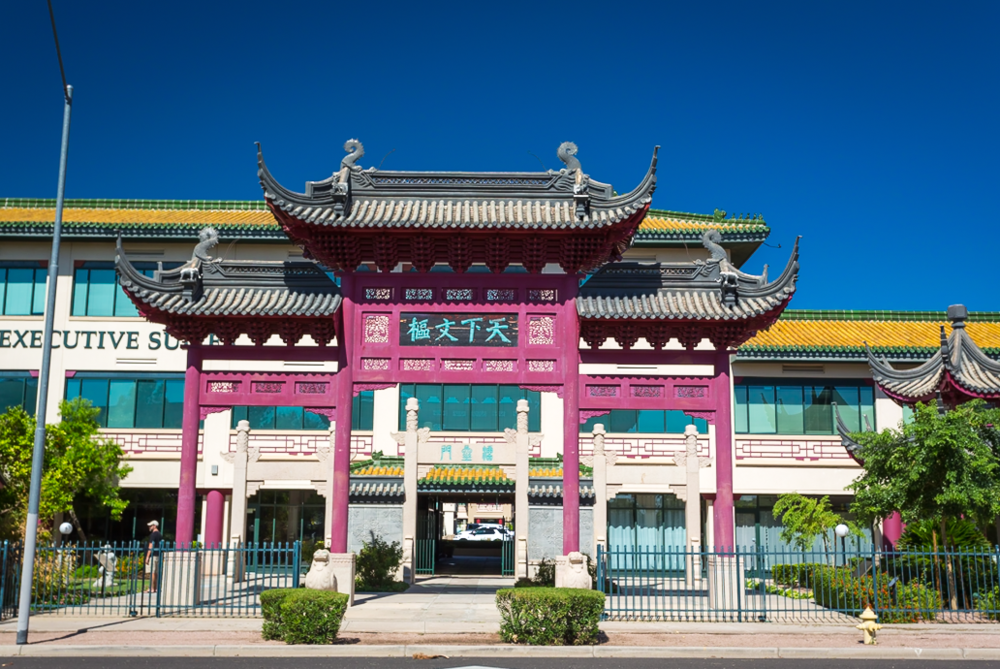
Replica of the Lingxing Gate at the Nanjing Fuzimiao. showing the typical Chinese elements used throughout the center (2017)

The original plans were announced in spring 1996, for a "Chinese Arizona Center" developed by Chinese-government owned COFCO's subsidiary BNU Corp. The project, to be built on 26 acres (11 ha) of vacant land on 44th street, between Phoenix Sky Harbor Airport and Arizona State Route 202, in the southern part of Phoenix's Camelback East urban village. It was to include a formal Chinese garden, restaurants, an outdoor Chinese market, along with office and retail space. Further plans called for the addition of a mid-size hotel and two 200,000 sq ft (19,000 m^{2}) 11-story office towers. The developer suggested the restaurants and stores with Chinese products would attract local residents as well as tourists, and that the center could be a venue for cultural activities such as Chinese New Year celebrations. The project required that the zoning classification of the property of the land be changed by the Phoenix City Council.

The project budget was $90 million, with $35 million allocated to the main building. The developer noted that the Phoenix metropolitan area had around 100,000 people of Asian descent at the time, yet was one of the largest cities in the county without a Chinese cultural center or a Chinatown area.

A groundbreaking ceremony was held in November 1996, complete with balloons, dancing dragons and a Feng Shui master. The first phase was a 160,000 sq ft (15,000 m^{2}) development on 8.6 acres (3.5 ha) of the site including office space, restaurants, stores, a Chinese supermarket. Non-commercial space included an area with formal Chinese gardens and pagodas.

Area Chinese-Americans said at the time that the center would "fulfill a longtime dream of their community, providing a place where they can meet and where other can come to learn more about China and its heritage." The developer also saw an opportunity to attract more Asian companies to Phoenix.

The architect was Cornoyer-Hedrick, a Phoenix firm, and the general contractor was Kitchell Corp. The topping out of the steel framework occurred in June, 1997.

== Architecture and construction ==
The center was structurally of modern construction with a steel frame, but designed with many traditional elements of Chinese architecture. The main building was topped by a Chinese roof adorned with Imperial roof decorations. To represent 5,000 years of Chinese cultural history, the "Chinese elements" were built with authentic materials and craftsmanship. Special visas were obtained for thirty master Chinese craftsmen, descendants of Forbidden City artisans, to come to Phoenix. They hand-tiled the roof with traditional methods, using one million "handcrafted" green and gold tiles made from special purple clay, the same material and methods used in the Forbidden City in Beijing". The yellow-glazed (gold) color is the color or royalty and was previously reserved only for roofs in the Forbidden City.

=== Gardens ===
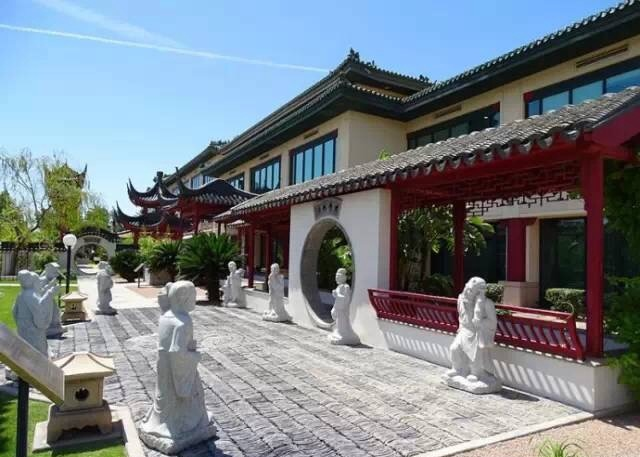
Entrance to the gardens lined with Chinese statues (2017)

The east side of the complex had Chinese gardens with replicas of ancient Chinese pagodas and statues. The gardens represented five different southern Chinese cities, covered 35,000 sq ft (3,300 m^{2}) and cost $1 million. It was designed by Ye Juhua, who also designed a garden at the Metropolitan Museum in New York and included Chinese plants, pagodas, Classical Chinese statues, fountains and koi ponds.

All the carved-wood elements in the garden were assembled with the traditional interlocking method used for a thousand years. There were no fasteners.

Included were two pi xiu statues (mythical creatures) hand-carved from granite quarried in China from the source of granite used during the Ming dynasty in the construction of the Forbidden City in Beijing.

Other features included a 30-foot (9.1 m) tall replica of the Lingxing Gate at the Nanjing Fuzimiao (Confucius Temple, Nanjing), West Lake in Hangzhou and the Surging Wave Pavilion, one of the Classical Gardens of Suzhou.

== Original tenants ==
=== Supermarket ===
The developer announced in August 1997 that the anchor tenant, the center's Asian supermarket, would be the 21st location of 99 Ranch Market and one of a few outside California. The chain, owned by TAWA, said the market would include live fish, and unique Asian fruit and vegetables and other items. It was the first tenant of the center to open in December, 1997. The store opened with 20,000 non-perishable items, 70% of which were imported, a fast-food buffet, a Taiwanese deli, and a Chinese bakery. The Asian produce was either imported or grown in California. Live seafood included catfish, lobster, crabs, and mussels. Many kinds of fresh fish were available. The store manager reported just after opening that its novelty made it a popular destination of school field trips.

=== Retail and other ===
The three-story center had approximately 78,000 sq ft (7,200 m^{2}) of office space on the upper two floors that could be leased or purchased. The ground floor had restaurants and other retail space. Although developed as a Chinese-themed center, there were also Korean, Japanese, and Taiwanese restaurants. The developer wanted the center "to be known as the place to go if you are looking for Asian food".

== Grand opening ==
The center was formally opened a year after the supermarket, in December 1998 with fireworks and lion dancers. Attendees at the ceremony included Li Zhaoxing, Chinese ambassador to the United States, US Senator Jon Kyl, and Secretary of State Betsy Bayless. Li said the project signified closer relations between China and the US.

=== Community reception ===
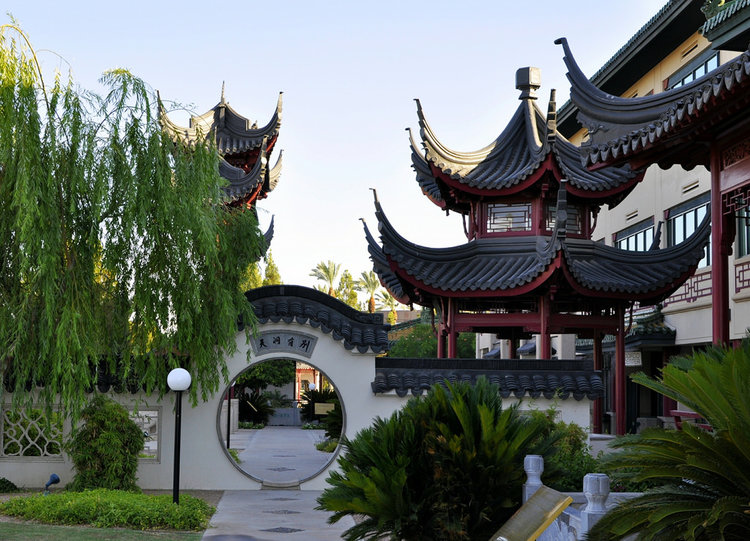
Replicas of ancient Chinese pagoda (2017)

As the center was owned by the communist government of China, it was not universally supported. A spokesperson downplayed political association, saying the center "signifies the culture of all the Chinese people". The director of the center, Chinese-born Elizabeth Mann also said the center was promoting culture and not government. The center was the host location of the annual Phoenix "Chinese Week" in 1999, but the opening ceremony was held at Phoenix City Hall due to concerns of Taiwanese participants. State representative Barry Wong noted that he supported the center, but had to be careful to "not promote their [China's] government". Others said that although the building showed Chinese architecture, beyond that and the gardens, "you don't see much Chinese culture there". Wong commented that the center planned to host Chinese artists and performers, but it was primarily a Chinese-themed for-profit commercial investment.

In February 2000, Falun Gong practitioners were asked to leave the center during the Chinese Week festival because it was "awkward and disrespectful" to the "honored guests and performers" from Chengdu, China, one of Phoenix's sister cities. Center management said they were not involved in this as the festival was administered by an independent Chinese organization. The Falun Gong group was told they would be welcomed the following year because the guests would be from Taipei, Phoenix's sister city in Taiwan.

The center also hosted an annual Harvest Moon Festival that had grown from a small ceremony for a few dozen into and event attended by several thousand by 2008, with a stage and continuous entertainment.

== Later development ==
Ichi Ban, an all-you-can-eat sushi buffet, was open in 2000. A bank geared toward the Asian-American community, the Asian Bank of Arizona, was added to the center in 2005. The other two-thirds of the site was developed and contained a surgical center and townhouses that did not carry any Chinese motif and thus were never considered part of the center. The hotel and office towers were not built.

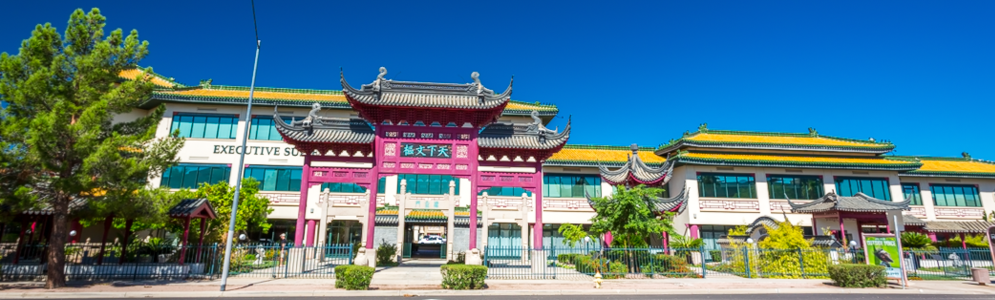

== Demise ==
Two of its restaurants, Golden Buddha, specializing in dim sum, and Lao Ching Hing Shanghai, closed in 2012, unable to survive the Great Recession. The center had struggled with occupancy for years and by 2017, the occupancy rate was 26% and only 6% of those were Chinese-related businesses. The annual Chinese New Year festival switched to another venue (Hance Park in downtown Phoenix) after 2012. COFCO decided to sell and stated to prospective buyers that the center had been "largely abandoned by the Chinese community and that no restrictions of any kind were being placed on the site which would impede redevelopment".

The property was sold by COFCO in June 2017 for $10.5 million to a private-equity company who planned to redevelop it for other uses, removing the elements of Chinese architecture and remodeling the property into a modern looking office building.

The new owner, True North (later Outlier) had budgeted $10 million to remodel the property as its own corporate headquarters, housing approximately 350 of its 12,500 employees.

The supermarket, which was renamed to Super L Ranch Market when it changed ownership c. 2006, did not have a long-term lease and was given thirty days, extended once, to vacate by True North. Super L rushed to relocate and moved several miles away to a smaller location in south Scottsdale, a defunct Fresh & Easy store, without room for the bakery, live seafood, or fresh meat department. It was unprofitable at the new location and closed in 2019.

Other businesses failed to reach agreements with True North to stay at the center. Beijing Garden, a restaurant, refused to leave after its lease expired. The restaurant said its attempts to extend or renew a lease were ignored. True North said it was ignored by the restaurant's owner and it resorted to legal "self-help" eviction methods such as cutting off utilities to force the restaurant to leave.

Preservationists and some members of the Chinese community fought to have the building and grounds kept intact, and the owner offered to keep the gardens in place. Lawyers for True North noted that the owner's property rights were protected by Proposition 207, requiring property owners to be compensated for loss of value caused by any government restriction of property rights, which was passed by a wide margin in the aftermath of 2005 US Supreme Court decision in Kelo v. City of New London.

Opposition was led by the Chinese United Association of Greater Phoenix, which represented nearly 20 different entities opposed to the redevelopment. The group attempted to explain the significance of the center to the Asian community, obtain a historic designation from the city, and pursued other legal efforts. True North said in 2017, after evicting Super L, that some of the smaller tenants would be able to stay in a much improved property. By mid-August, almost 4,000 people signed a petition asking that the center be preserved and a protest attracted 250. Hundreds returned for weekly protests on the weekends.

Initially, True North offered several concessions including maintaining the garden area and keeping it open to the public during business hours, relocating statues and signs, spare roof tiles and other unique elements to another location, preservation of the Welcome Gate, and providing 8,000 sq ft (740 m^{2}) of space for non-profit use for up to three years.

In a September 2017 Phoenix City Council meeting, nearly 200 citizens, many Chinese-American, attended to seek historic designation for the center. The council voted unanimously to consider the issue further if the preservation proponents produced an analysis of the property's historical significance. The council decision did not prevent the developer from moving forward. The citizen's petition, which had accumulated 16,000 signatures by the meeting, required a formal response from the city according to the city charter. The petition asked the council to "ensure long-term preservation" of the center. The petition did allow the issue to get before the council without going through the normal historic-preservation process. The council could not have approved the measure (granting a historic designation) without violating a state law requiring consent of the property owner. Furthermore, officials of the City of Phoenix Historic Preservation Office said that sites must be at least 50 years old or be "exceptionally important" to receive a historic designation. (Note: The only property in Phoenix that was less than 50 years old when it received an historic designation is the Santa Rita Center, where Cesar Chavez's 24-Day Fast for Justice took place in 1972 during the civil rights movement.)

On September 13, 2017, access to the gardens was restricted by fencing, leading to claims of religious prejudice by Taoists and Buddhists who used the garden for prayer and meditation. The group's lawyer claimed that the practitioners of Taoism, Buddhism, and Confucianism were discriminated against and would have been treated differently, had they "been members of more prominent religions such as Christianity or Judaism".

Elizabeth Mann, who was heavily involved in the original development of the center and ran it for its first decade, left BNU in 2008 and was a leader of the redevelopment opposition. Her group frequently protested at the site for over a year.

A legal battle ensued. A request to a federal judge to prohibit changes to the center's "religious elements" was denied. In September, a Maricopa County Superior Court judge issued a temporary restraining order prohibiting removal of the tile roofing and the garden statues for five weeks. It was lifted at the end of November. This case had been brought by a minority owner of the center, the operator of the Szechwan Palace restaurant who owned 5% of the center (Note: The center was divided into 103 condominium units, True North owned 98 units) and said the removal of the Chinese elements would hurt its business, noting that business had already declined 30 to 50% after the garden area was fenced off. The company argued that the CC&Rs prohibited such alteration if it interfered with the "rights of any non-consenting owners in the use of their units". Elizabeth Mann testified that the CC&Rs were written to "ensure the center's Chinese elements would always remain" and the restaurant's lawyer said the roof acted as a "giant sign" for the restaurant. The judge acknowledged that the roof may have helped the restaurant attract business, but its removal did not interfere with the restaurant's use of its space and thus did not violate the CC&Rs. The construction ban was lifted in early December. In late December, construction was again halted when the restaurant appealed. In February 2018, the Arizona Court of Appeals agreed to review the appeal, thus extending it further. This was one of six lawsuits filed trying to stop evictions and force preservation of the center. The owners of the Szechwan Palace filed one suit against the city claiming that the city itself violated zoning ordinances by issuing the construction permit allowing destruction of the "Chinese roof". The religious discrimination suit was filed in Federal court and alleged converting the center to corporate offices was "desecration of a house of worship". Another restaurant sued over the way its lease was terminated, the supermarket sued for defamation, and True North sued the supermarket owner for defamation, which was rebuffed as a prohibited SLAPP action.

Local orthopedic surgeon Dr. Anthony Yeung said he was organizing a purchase plan by Chinese community members in May 2018. True North's owner, David Tedesco, said he would be willing to entertain an offer.

The Chinese United Association of Greater Phoenix had hired Tom Simon as its spokesperson. He had attended the first organized protest and "claimed to have media and political connections". He regularly represented the group at Phoenix City Council meetings with an aggressive style. When news of his criminal background surfaced, Yeung raised concerns. Simon was accused of sexually harassing a Chinese-American woman and arrested, which cost him his job as spokesman in July. Former Phoenix mayor Phil Gordon, who initially supported the preservationists, said Simon's unprofessionalism caused him to withdraw his assistance. Gordon said Simon was the primary reason the dispute was not settled out of court through amicable negotiations. However, a lawyer for the Chinese community said the Simon issue was just a diversion orchestrated by True North.

By September 2018, the number of legal challenges had grown to ten. The community took the protest to social media and held an in-person protest against Kate Gallego, a 2018 Phoenix mayoral candidate who had "accepted $75,000 in campaign donations from the owners of [the center] and their spouses." Yeung was quoted in the media as saying "Why would David Tedesco take on the Chinese community when he can acquire property elsewhere?" Others had often noted that True North could go into any office building, while there was only one irreplaceable Chinese Cultural Center. Tedesco's response was that the $10.5 million he paid for the center was "extremely inexpensive".

In December 2018, Chinese-American community members claimed that had the "money and resources to purchase the center" and were willing to buy the center for $18 million. The owner reportedly said the offer was a year too late and the property was not for sale and that they had never received a "serious and credible offer" earlier when they were willing to sell. The company continued interior demolition and remodeling while the injunction prevented work on the exterior.

Despite being a 5% owner of the center and having the strongest lawsuit blocking the makeover, Szechwan Palace closed in December 2018 after 19 years at the center, announcing that it would relocate the business.

Ultimately, the owner prevailed and eventually evicted the last tenants. The roof tiles were too deteriorated to save, and the gardens were leveled. The only elements kept were approximately two dozen stone carvings of classical Chinese guardian figures. Some were supposedly made from a stone that could no longer be exported from its source province in China. As of January, 2020, the statues were in storage. The center was renamed the Outlier Center reflecting its use as an office building for the global headquarters of the new owner.

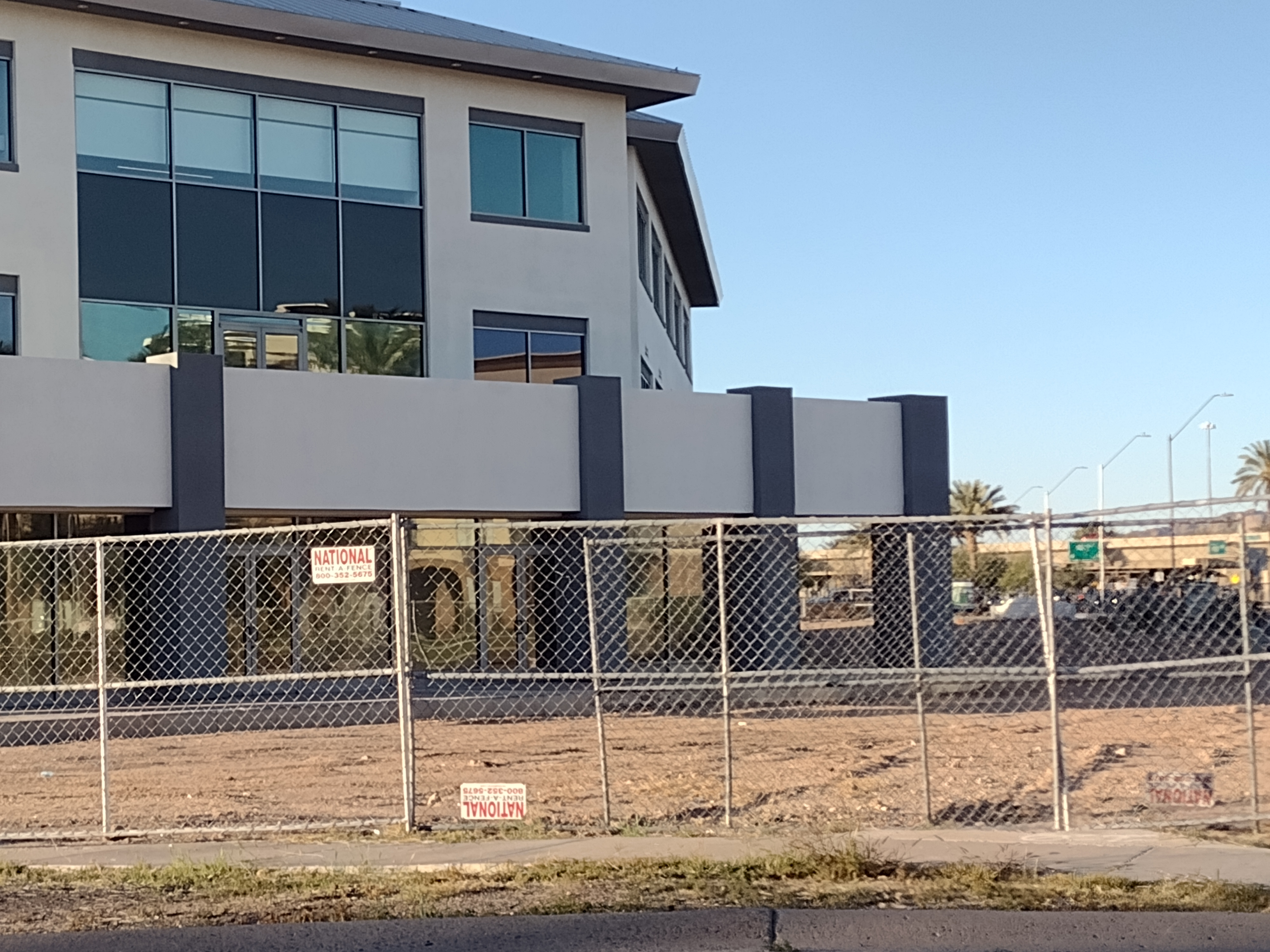
The southeast corner in 2022, location of the Chinese gardens

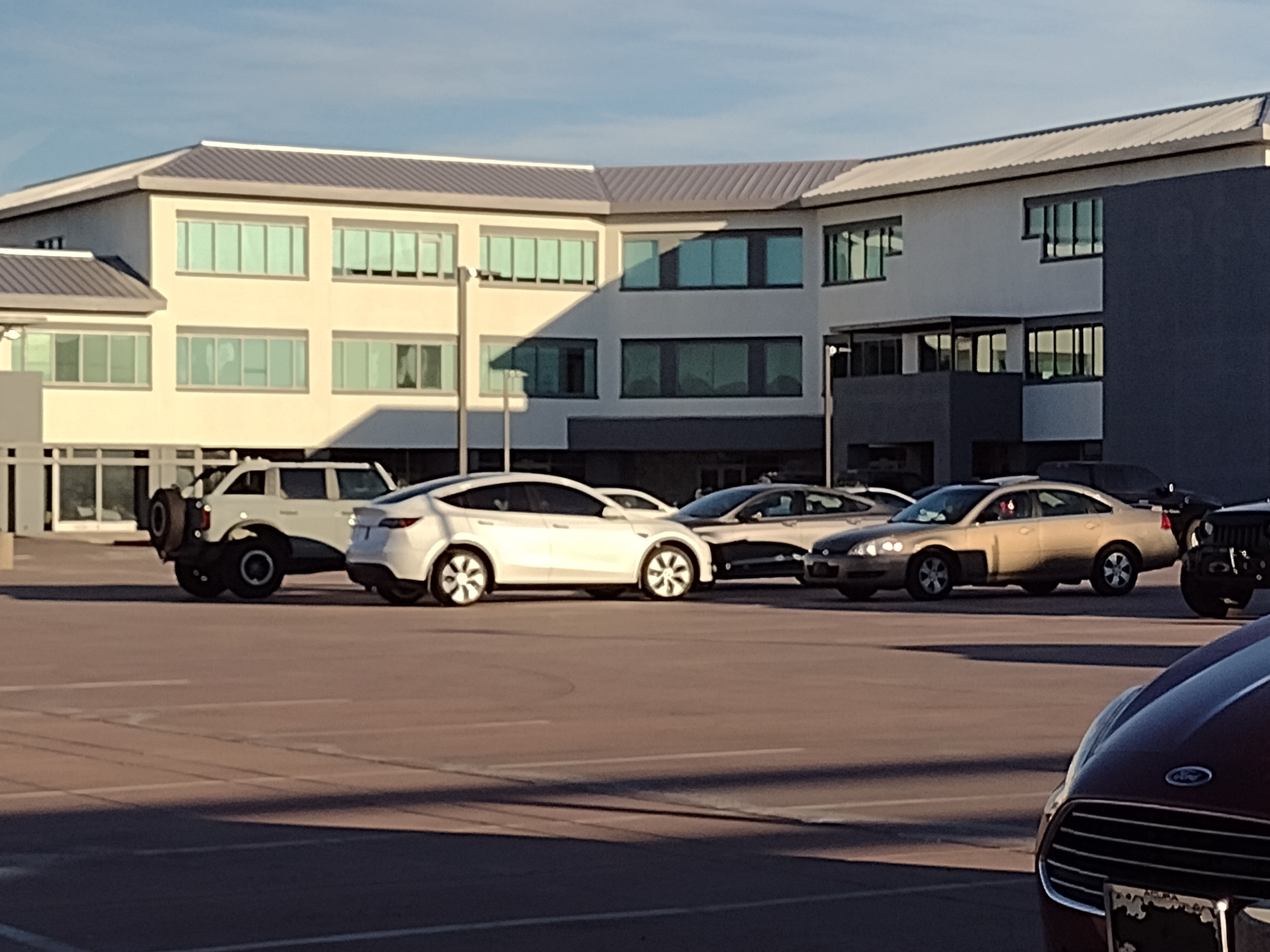
The west side in 2022, main entrance

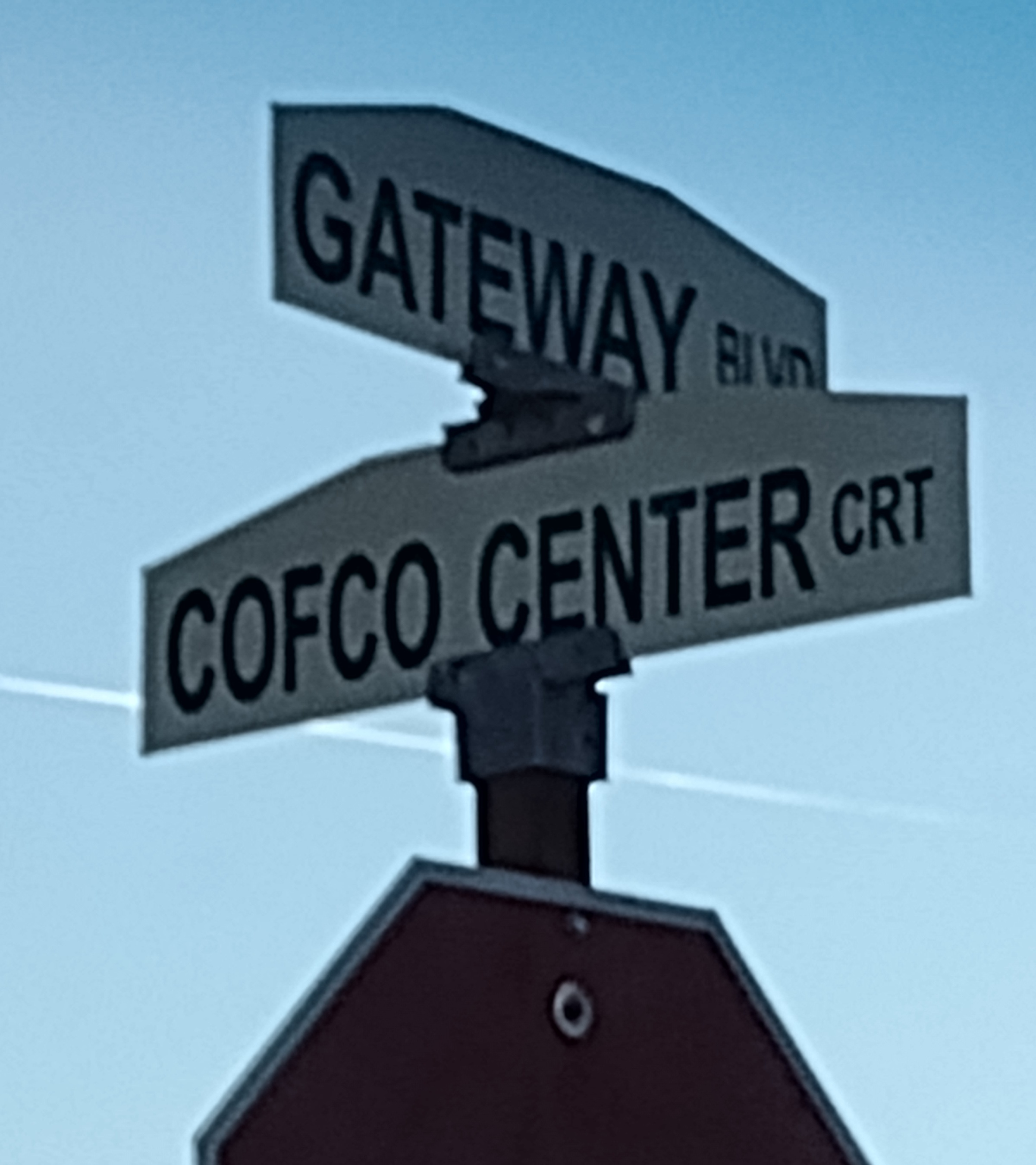
Street sign in 2022 still showing "COFCO" name

== Chinatowns in Phoenix ==
Phoenix had a Chinatown in the 1870s populated mostly by Chinese who had emigrated the US to work on construction of railroads, especially the Southern Pacific Railroad being built across the state in the late 1870s. The area was taken over by white businessmen by 1895. A second Chinatown existed in the early 20th century but also dissolved, with the Sun Mercantile Building, built in 1929, being the only structure to survive. The rest of Phoenix's second Chinatown is now a basketball stadium and a baseball park. Since the closure of the Chinese Cultural Center, an area in west Mesa has developed with, as of March 2022, over 70 Asian-themed restaurants, grocery stores, and other businesses on Dobson Road.

== See also ==
- Chinatown, Phoenix
