= Tessys method =

Herniated disk surgical procedure

- Specialty: Orthopedic surgeon, neurosurgery

The TESSYS method (transforaminal endoscopic surgical system) is a minimally-invasive, endoscopic spinal procedure for the treatment of a herniated disc. It was a further development of the YESS method by the Dutch Dr Thomas Hoogland in the Alpha Klinik in Munich in 1989 and was first called THESSYS (Thomas Hoogland EndoScopic SYStem). The procedure involves performing a small foramenotomy and removal of soft tissue compressing the nerve root.

== Concept ==
With the Tessys method, the surgeon removes the herniated portions of the disc using posterior lateral endoscopic access. This surgical method for spinal disc herniations is especially gentle for the patient. During the procedure, the patient is positioned either in the lateral or prone position, and local anesthetic is administered, usually in combination with sedation. The patient remains responsive, and typically general anesthesia is not necessary. The surgeon removes the herniated disc tissue through an access tube of mere millimeters via the intervertebral foramen. With special instruments, the surgeon progressively and gently dilates to access the disc without disrupting the surrounding muscles or conjunctive tissue.

== History ==
The first blind transforaminal discectomy was done by Parvis Kambin in 1973 with Craig's canula's. The Tessys method was a further development of the existing YESS method (American Anthony Yeung) by the Dutch Thomas Hoogland in 1989 in Munich by reaming a few mm's from the SAP (Superior Articular Process). As of January 2018, more than 400,000 patients worldwide are operated with the TESSYS method. Most of them with the original joimax reamers or the newer safer MaxMoreSpine drills also developed and patented by Dr Thomas Hoogland

The system was introduced in the Netherlands in 2004 under the acronym PTED (Percutaneous Transforaminal Endoscopic Discectomy) by orthopaedic surgeon M. Iprenburg, who has since then successfully used the procedure with over 2600 of hernia patients with the joimax reamers.

== Indication ==
The Tessys method is suitable for most prolapsed discs, regardless of the anatomical position. Another spinal indication for the Tessys procedure would be cauda equina syndrome, in a case where conservative methods of treatment failed to ameliorate the pain, or if only surrounded nerves are affected. Every intervertebral surgery requires a prior detailed discussion with the patient and imaging diagnostics such as MRI, CT scans and/or X-ray. Monitoring of the compressed nerves and associated pathways is indicated due to the proximity of surgical manipulations that are in contact with nerve roots and/or the spinal cord. Monitoring modalities indicated are continuous somatosensory evoked potentials and spontaneous electromyography of the muscles supplied by the affected nerve roots. Performing a discogram during the surgery procedure provides additional confirmation of the patient's anatomy and the position of the disc prolapse but might increase the degenerative changes in the disc. .

== Surgical procedure ==
To remove a herniated disc, the Tessys method uses a lateral, transforaminal, endoscopic access path via the intervertebral foramen. The surgery takes about 45–75 minutes. During the procedure, the patient is either in the lateral or prone position. The operation is preferable done under analgo-sedation in daysurgery. In Germany patients have however to stay for three days in the hospital to get proper payment from insurance companies.

The access to the prolapse is achieved using a three-step guide wire technique: The surgeon gradually dilates through the soft tissue with the aid of C-arm radiographic monitoring and stretches the foramen step-by-step, with little or no disturbance to the surrounding muscles and nerves. Utilizing Tessys via nature's entry point, also known as Kambin's Triangle, preserves the stability of the spinal column.

The endoscope features a slim working channel to guide instruments to the anatomy. The surgeon leads the endoscope through the working tube while in surgery. The camera emits pictures and/or video of the operating field to a monitor, while the surgeon uses special surgical instruments to remove the herniated disc material safely, with precision.

== Advantages ==
- Minimally-invasive surgical access: the risks of bleeding, infection and nerve injury are reduced
- Less post-operative pain: no wound or muscle pain
- Short recovery period and fast return to active lifestyle
- No general anesthetic necessary: the risks of nerve injury or thrombosis are significantly reduced; less cardiac cycle stress
- Immediate pain relief directly after the surgery procedure in 90% of cases
- Direct access to the sequester of the herniated disc
- Cost-saving method due to the reduced length of hospital stay

== Disadvantages ==
- Steeper learning curve compared to open surgery techniques
- Costs of instruments and technologies
- Technically demanding surgical procedure

== Studies ==
Studies document the advantages and the success of minimally invasive endoscopic spine surgery. The US research clinic the Cleveland Foundation agrees that the recovery period in patients treated with the Tessys method is accelerated by several weeks to months in comparison to conventionally treated patients. Many other studies document a success rate of more than 93%. In January 2018 more as 3000 publications about endoscopic spine surgery are found in PubMed. Among them 2 RCT's. In the USA a complete new coding system was started for all endoscopic spine procedures. In the Netherlands the procedure was called experimental in 2006.

== Literature ==
- F. Alfen et al., Developments in the Area of Endoscopic Spine Surgery. In European Musculoskeletal Review 2006
- M. Iprenburg, Transforaminal Endoscopic Surgery - Technique and Provisional Results in Primary Disc Herniation. In European Musculoskeletal Review 2007
- K. Lewandrowski, Pre-operative Planning for Endoscopic Lumbar Foraminal Decompression - A Prospective Study. In European Musculoskeletal Review 2006
- M. Iprenburg and Dr. Alexander Godschalx, Transforaminal Endoscopic Surgery in Lumbar Disc Herniation in an Economic Crisis - The TESSYS Method. In US Musculoskeletal Review 2009
- R. Morgenstern, Transforaminal Endoscopic Stenosis Surgery – A Comparative Study of Laser and Reamed Foraminoplasty. In European Musculoskeletal Review 2007
- M. Schubert, Dr. Thomas Hoogland, Endoscopic Transforaminal Nucleotomy with Foraminoplasty for Lumbar Disk Herniation. In European Musculoskeletal Review 2006
