= Gabor B. Racz =

Anesthesiologist and medical educator (1937–2025)

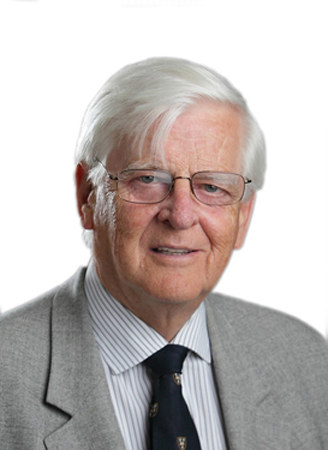
- Racz in 2010
- Born: July 6, 1937; Budapest, Hungary
- Died: June 21, 2025 (aged 87); Dallas, Texas, U.S.
- Education: Semmelweis University Medical School; University of Liverpool, M.B., Ch.B
- Spouse: Enid Racz
- Children: 4
- Medical career
- Profession: Professor; anesthesiologist; pain management physician
- Field: Anesthesiology; pain management pharmacology; emergency & critical care
- Institutions: Messer-Racz International Pain Center
- Sub-specialties: Interventional pain management; CRPS
- Research: Chronic complex pain
- Awards: TTU Grover E. Murray Professorship; ASIPP Lifetime Achievement Award; IPS Moricca Award

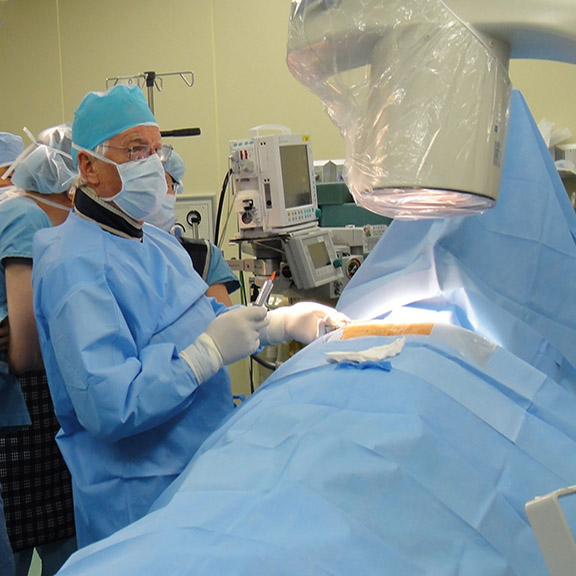
Racz during a procedure in 2011

Gábor Béla Rácz (July 6, 1937 – June 21, 2025) was a Hungarian-American board-certified anesthesiologist and professor emeritus at Texas Tech University Health Science Center (TTUHSC) in Lubbock, Texas, where he was also Chairman Emeritus of the Department of Anesthesiology and Co-Director of Pain Services. He has worked in the field of chronic back pain and complex regional pain syndrome (CRPS).

In 1982, he designed the Racz catheter, a flexible, spring-wound catheter with a small fluoroscopic probe. In 1989, he developed epidural lysis of adhesions, sometimes referred to as percutaneous adhesiolysis, or simply the Racz procedure. It is a minimally invasive, percutaneous intervention for treating chronic spinal pain often due to scarring after post lumbar surgery syndrome, sometimes called failed back surgery, and also low-back and radicular pain from spinal stenosis, a disease of aging. The procedure is somewhat similar to an epidural and is used when conventional methods have failed. The Racz procedure may employ the use of a wire-bound catheter to mechanically break-up or dissolve scar tissue, also called epidural adhesions or fibrosis, which have formed around the nerve roots, and allows for local anesthetics, saline, and steroids to be injected into the affected area.

Racz was born in Hungary and, as a young man, had aspirations to become a medical doctor. He was a second-year medical student in November 1956 when he was forced to flee Hungary after the Soviets invaded Budapest in response to the Hungarian Revolution. He eventually arrived in England and resumed his education. He graduated from the University of Liverpool School of Medicine, and worked in the UK until 1963 at which time he moved to the United States. He completed his anesthesiology residency at SUNY Upstate Medical University in Syracuse, New York. He also worked as an associate attending anesthesiologist and respiratory consultant for other hospitals including the Veterans Administration Hospital, and the UHS Chenango Memorial Hospital in Norwich, New York, before moving to Lubbock, Texas, where he became the first chairman of anesthesiology for the then-new Texas Tech University Health Sciences Center (TTUHSC). Racz is also one of the founders of the World Institute of Pain.

== Early life and education ==
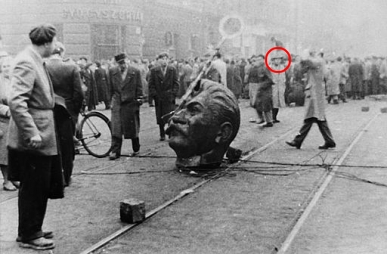
Racz (circled) during the 1956 Hungarian Revolution

Racz was born in the Kingdom of Hungary to parents with a financially meager background which he attributed in part to his family's resistance to join the Communist party. He attended Semmelweis University Medical School, and it was during his second year there that the Hungarian Revolution of 1956 had begun. After seeing hundreds of injured people, he volunteered to help at the hospital. He said he received a signed directive to drive a truck and deliver sugar to the medical school clinics which he believed motivated the Hungarian Secret Police to seek him out for questioning. He also recalled a shooting incident where a bullet missed his head by "a few inches".

On November 27, 1956, he fled from Budapest to Austria with his future wife Enid, his sister, brother-in-law, and a few others after the Soviets invaded the city. He had no prior intention to leave Hungary until he learned from his mother that the Hungarian Secret Police were looking for him. Racz said if they found him, "That would have meant the end of my dreams to become a doctor. Perhaps I would have ended up in prison. Not that I had done anything but many other people ended up in prison following 1956 without committing any crime." He arrived in the Austrian town of Eisenstadt where buses were waiting to take refugees to their new homes. Racz chose the bus to England, and he along with his family and other members of his group were transported to a military base in the Midlands.

In 1957, as a former Hungarian medical student, Racz received a scholarship to attend second-year medical school in Liverpool, England. In 1962, he graduated from the University of Liverpool School of Medicine with Bachelor of Medicine (M.B.) and Bachelor of Surgery (Ch.B) degrees. Ian McWhinney and his wife helped Racz get his start as a doctor by providing him with rent-free lodging so he could finish his education. He said their generosity became a lifelong example in that "one must study and pass on knowledge and help the next generation." Racz later served as house surgeon and physician at the Royal Southern Hospital in Liverpool.

== Career in the United States ==
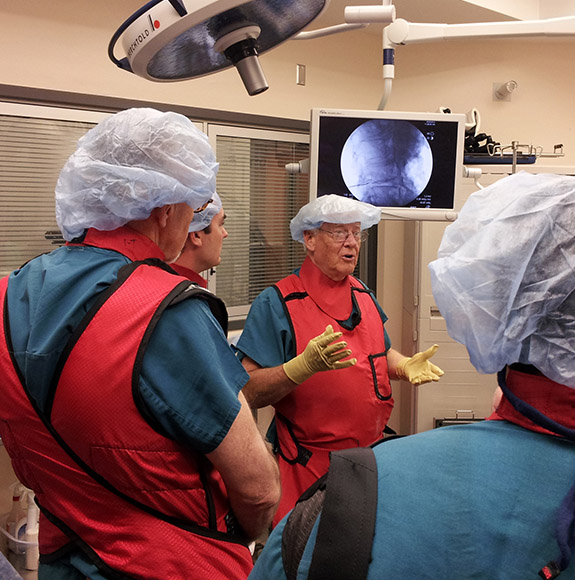
Racz (center) in a procedural lecture in 2012

In 1963, Racz moved to the United States for an anesthesiology residency at SUNY Upstate Medical University in Syracuse, New York. Upon completion, he worked in several positions at SUNY, including associate attending anesthesiologist and respiratory consultant in the neurological head injury unit as well as a consultant for the Veterans Administration Hospital, and the UHS Chenango Memorial Hospital in Norwich, New York.

In 1977, Racz joined the then-new Texas Tech University Health Sciences Center (TTUHSC) and was designated as the Center's first Chairman of Anesthesiology. He held that position until March 1, 1999. His work from 1977 to 2006 not only included treating patients, he also served as acting director of pain services at TTUHSC, and oversaw the expansion of operations and future development of the Messer-Racz International Pain Center named in recognition of Racz's work and the Messer family's financial contributions. In 2015, Racz held the designation of Professor and Chairman Emeritus, Director of Pain Services for Texas Tech University Health Sciences Center.

Throughout his career, Racz has also conducted research and co-authored articles with other experts in pain management to improve diagnosis and treatment of complex regional pain syndromes (CRPS), a long-term disorder of the nervous system which is a challenging pain problem that is often misunderstood and misdiagnosed.

== Racz catheter and Racz procedure ==
Racz's work with nerve stimulators, spinal cord stimulators, radiofrequency thermocoagulation, and a wide range of other pain management procedures is being used in interventional pain practices throughout the world. He developed new designs in medical equipment and devices.

In 1982, Racz designed the Racz catheter, a flexible, spring-wound catheter with a small fluoroscopic probe. In 1989, he developed epidural lysis of adhesions, a minimally invasive, percutaneous procedure also known as the "Racz procedure", which is somewhat similar to an epidural. It is used to treat patients with chronic low back pain due to post lumbar surgery syndrome, sometimes called failed back surgery, which involves scar tissue that has formed around the nerve root. It is also used to treat protruding or herniated disks, fractures, degeneration, or radicular pain from spinal stenosis, a disease of aging.

The Racz procedure employs a wire-bound or spring loaded catheter to mechanically break-up or dissolve scar tissue, also called epidural adhesions or fibroids, that have formed around the nerve roots, and allows for local anesthetics, saline, and steroids to be injected into the affected area. This procedure was assigned a Current Procedural Terminology (CPT) code in 2000.

== Death ==
Racz died on June 21, 2025 at the age of 87. He was honored worldwide for his pioneering work in interventional pain management. As chairman emeritus of anesthesiology at Texas Tech University Health Sciences Center and co-founder of the World Institute of Pain, his influence reached across continents. His commitment to education and clinical excellence lives on through the Annual Gabor Racz Pain Conference in Budapest and Racz EDU, the educational platform that bears his name and offers both global hands-on workshops and online content to promote excellence in interventional pain medicine.

== Recognition and awards ==
In 1996, Racz was the first recipient of the Grover E. Murray Professorship, TTUHSC's highest award.

In December 1998, the University Medical Center named him to a $1 million endowed chair in recognition of his work at TTUHSC and the University Medical Center.

In 2004, he received the Lifetime Achievement Award presented by the American Society of Interventional Pain Physicians.

In October 2012, the New York/New Jersey Societies of Interventional Pain Physicians awarded Racz a lifetime achievement award.

== Selected works ==
Racz has published in many scientific publications. Among his works are:

- Racz G., 1985: Capnography In The Operating Room: An Introductory Directory. by May, Wr., J. E. Heavner, D. Mcwhorter And G. Racz. Vi 58p. Raven Press Books, Ltd: New York, N.Y., USA. Illus. Paper. Vi 58p
- Racz, Gabor B. 1989 Techniques of Neurolysis Gabor Racz (Ed.), ISBN 978-1-4899-6723-7 (Print) 978-1-4899-6721-3 (Online), Current Management of Pain, Vol. 4, Springer U.S.
