= Chinatown, Phoenix =

Phoenix Chinatown
- Neighborhood
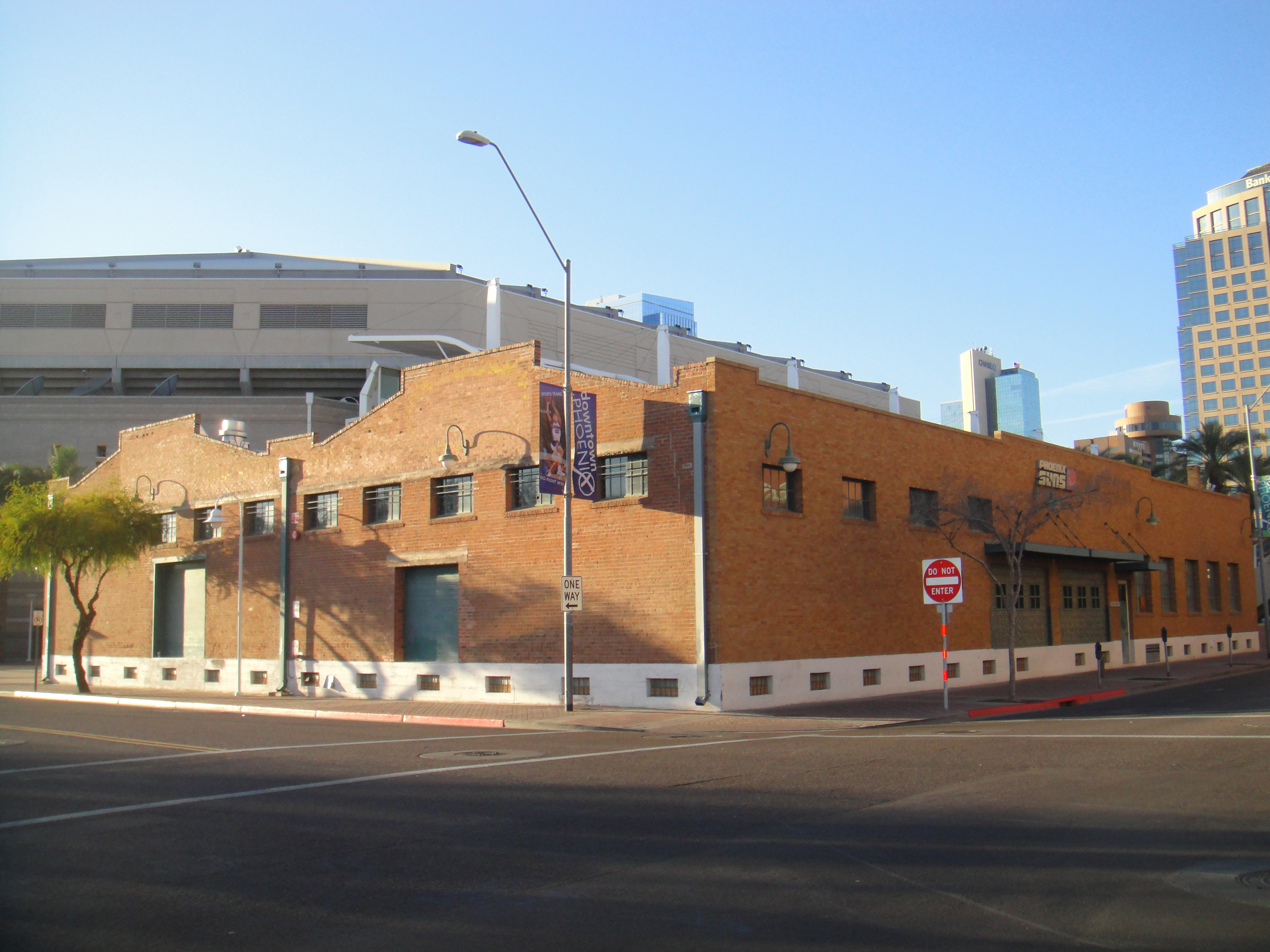
- Sun Mercantile Building, the last remaining building in the area once called "Chinatown"
- Interactive map of Phoenix Chinatown
- Coordinates: 33.4461°N 112.0725°W
- Country: United States
- State: Arizona
- City: Phoenix
- Original location: 1870s
- Second location: 1890s
- Dissolved: 1940s–1950s

A Chinatown developed in Phoenix in the 1870s as the predominantly single male Chinese population self-segregated primarily to provide cultural support to each other in a place where they faced significant discrimination. They came to dominate certain types of jobs and made an impression on the greater community with their celebrations of Chinese holidays. Other aspects of their culture, primarily gambling and the smoking of opium were viewed less favorably, and in the 1890s, they were forced to establish a new Chinatown several blocks away from the prior prime downtown location, where their community would be "less visible".

The new Chinatown grew to be much larger than the original, as the Chinese population increased and successive generations became more likely to plan to stay in the country, have families, and own and operate businesses. Chinatown was "governed" for decades by unofficial "mayor" Louie Ong, also known as "China Dick", who was given considerable "authority" by city officials. Ong represented the biggest family or clan in Phoenix, who had emigrated from the village in Hoiping county in Guangdong Province, southeast China, where most Phoenix Chinese traced their ancestry. The Chinese prospered, often as grocery merchants, and gradually became more assimilated. Through this process, they more often lived outside Chinatown to take advantages of the city's growth and to distance themselves from the seedy reputation of Chinatown's gambling and opium dens. By the 1950s, Chinatown had largely dissolved with the Chinese population scattered throughout the city and its suburbs. One grocery warehouse building remained standing after the area was demolished in the 1980s to build the American West Arena.

== First Chinatown ==
The first few Chinese immigrants in the Arizona Territory came in the late 1860s, with the 1870 census registering 21 Chinese in the territory. The construction of the Southern Pacific Railroad brought more Chinese workers, many of whom remained after the railroad work was finished. They settled in several towns. (Note: The 1880 U.S. Census listed 1,630 Chinese in the territory, with 160 in Tucson. A newspaper reported "75 or 80" in Prescott in 1879.) By 1880, there were 164 in Maricopa County, with 110 of those in Phoenix, 4.6% of the town's population. Most were single men, often intending to eventually return to China.

The Chinese in Phoenix faced racial prejudice and were relegated to working in gardening, laundries, restaurants, and performing domestic work. A Chinatown developed at First and Adams Street, in downtown Phoenix where the Chinese maintained familiar cultural traditions, including language, and the annual Chinese New Year celebration complete with firecrackers, dancing dragons, and other traditional music and entertainment.

Chinatown extended from Monroe Street on the north to Jefferson Street on the south and from Montezuma (now First Street) to Cortez (now First Avenue). Most Chinese businesses were clustered around First St and Adams. Chinese imported goods were obtained from other Chinese firms in San Francisco and Los Angeles. Chinese vegetables were grown locally in an area south of town known as the Chinese Gardens. The farmers grew all types of vegetables and sold them from wagons throughout Phoenix.

Chinese businesses did operate outside the area as well; many Chinese-owned groceries were located in Mexican American neighborhoods. Usually living at the business instead of commuting to Chinatown, the owners' children often learned Spanish before English.

Anti-Chinese sentiment existed, but without the violence that occurred in other places, especially California. No anti-Chinese legislation was passed in Arizona or Phoenix, and there were no lynchings or riots. Discrimination was unofficial and verbal. The Federal Chinese Exclusion Acts were effectively not enforced in the territory and very few Chinese were deported. By 1940, the Chinese population in Phoenix had increased to 431 (while the statewide number decreased to 1419.

Arizona did attempt to prevent the use of opium, but despite periodic raids, the opium dens mostly operated figuratively and literally underground, with "secret chambers" excavated under buildings. There was also criticism of gambling operations, and Chinese laundries, which were said to be "public nuisances".

== Second Chinatown ==
Location of the two Chinatowns
1 Chinatown (c. 1870–1890)
2 Chinatown (c. 1890–1950)

Around 1890 to 1895, the community was forced to leave the prime downtown location and move several blocks south where a Chinatown would be less visible. Developers were eager to take over the old location. The new Chinatown, centered at First and Madison, developed with Chinese grocery stores, laundries, and other shops, often with the proprietors living above.

The new Chinatown extended from Madison Street on the north one block south to Jackson Street between First and Third streets, with a concentration between First and Second from Madison south one half block to the "Chinese Alley". An "impressive" joss house (temple) was constructed, and as before, opium and gambling dens could be found.

Although Congress had prohibited Chinese nationals from owning property, real estate transactions occurred anyway without regard to the law or with property deeds recorded in the name of American-born children who were citizens by birth and thus eligible to own property.

Most early Chinese in Phoenix emigrated from one village in Hoiping in Guangdong Province in southeast China. Many Chinese were from the extended Ong family, whose Phoenix clan, led by Louie Ong ("China Dick") grew with additional relatives from both San Francisco and Guangdong. Louie was known as the "unofficial" mayor of Chinatown. Ong and other prominent Chinese effectively policed Chinatown, leading one Phoenix judge to declare in 1911 that "the Chinese are the most orderly of all the people in Phoenix". Ong was asked by Booker T. Washington how he became "mayor", he explained that over 30 years he had learned American "customs and manners" allowing him to bridge both communities. Washington noted that Phoenix police would hand any petty Chinese criminal over to "Mayor Dick" for justice rather than using the official court system.

When it came to the gambling and opium activities, Ong and other Chinese viewed these as traditions not to be bothered. Throughout the 1910s and 1920s, Phoenix police and federal narcotics officers continued raids on both. An August 1923 raid netted "large quantities" of opium and cocaine hidden in a Chinatown restaurant.

Over time, families became more common and the community was supported by organizations such as the Chinese Baptist Church, Chinese Boy Scouts, Chinese Salvation Society, and Chinese Chamber of Commerce. During an archaeological excavation, a Chinese liquor bottle was found which matched ceramic fragments found at the site of Roosevelt Dam, suggest some Chinese workers participated in its construction c. 1905–1910.

Revolutionary leader Sun Yat-sen, also a native of Canton, the capital of Guandgong Province, visited Phoenix's Chinatown in early 1911 to solicit contributions for his fight to overthrow the Qing Dynasty, China's last imperial government. Louie Ong flew the flag of the new Republic of China outside his store at First Street in Madison in October 1911 upon Sun's victory. Further efforts to aid the Republic occurred in 1922 when Kerman L. Wong, leader of the Chinese Nationalist Party in the United States came to Phoenix to establish a branch of the San Francisco-headquartered organization. Within a month, the branch had 100 members and an office at 221 E. Madison. Phoenix held Double Ten Day celebrations honoring the founding of the republic for years.

As the Chinese became more prosperous, there was more assimilation into the community at large. Louie Ong and others participated in the 1918 July 4 parade with a float, characterized as "one of the most beautiful ever exhibited in Phoenix". In July 1922, the community donated $1,000 towards the construction of the first permanent building for Phoenix's first hospital, Arizona Deaconess Hospital at 10th Street and McDowell (about two miles (3.2 km) north of Chinatown).

Chinese opened businesses outside of Chinatown, 53 by 1929. Such relocation continued and this Chinatown started to dissolve by the early 1940s, with the Chinese population dispersed throughout the city and its suburbs. Some Chinese leaders encouraged Chinese to leave Chinatown to minimize the "attention and conflict" that was occurring in "high-profile" Chinatowns like San Francisco and New York. The gambling and illegal drugs continued through the 1930s giving Chinatown "a bad image" with which successful Chinese wanted to disassociate. They led the way in relocating to other areas of the city. During World War II, in which China allied with the U.S., anti-Chinese laws were repealed and Chinese faced less prejudice. Greater "Americanization" fueled the collapse of small Chinatowns throughout the country.

One successful merchant was Tang Shing, who came to Phoenix from Guangdong in 1910 to visit his brother. He stayed and opened a grocery store at 622 S. 7th St which grew into Sun Mercantile Company, the largest grocery wholesaler in Phoenix. It opened the $80,000 Sun Mercantile Building in 1929 at 3rd & Jackson to support his "thriving empire" which is the most prominent building remaining from Chinatown. The building was listed on the National Register of Historic Places in 1985. In 2005, the Phoenix Suns basketball organization proposed building a new $200 million luxury high-rise hotel and condominium tower, part of which would be atop the Sun Mercantile Building. The building's roof would be removed and the base incorporated into the tower. Despite opposition by historic preservationists and the city's Asian American community, the city council approved the project. The project was later blocked by a lawsuit.

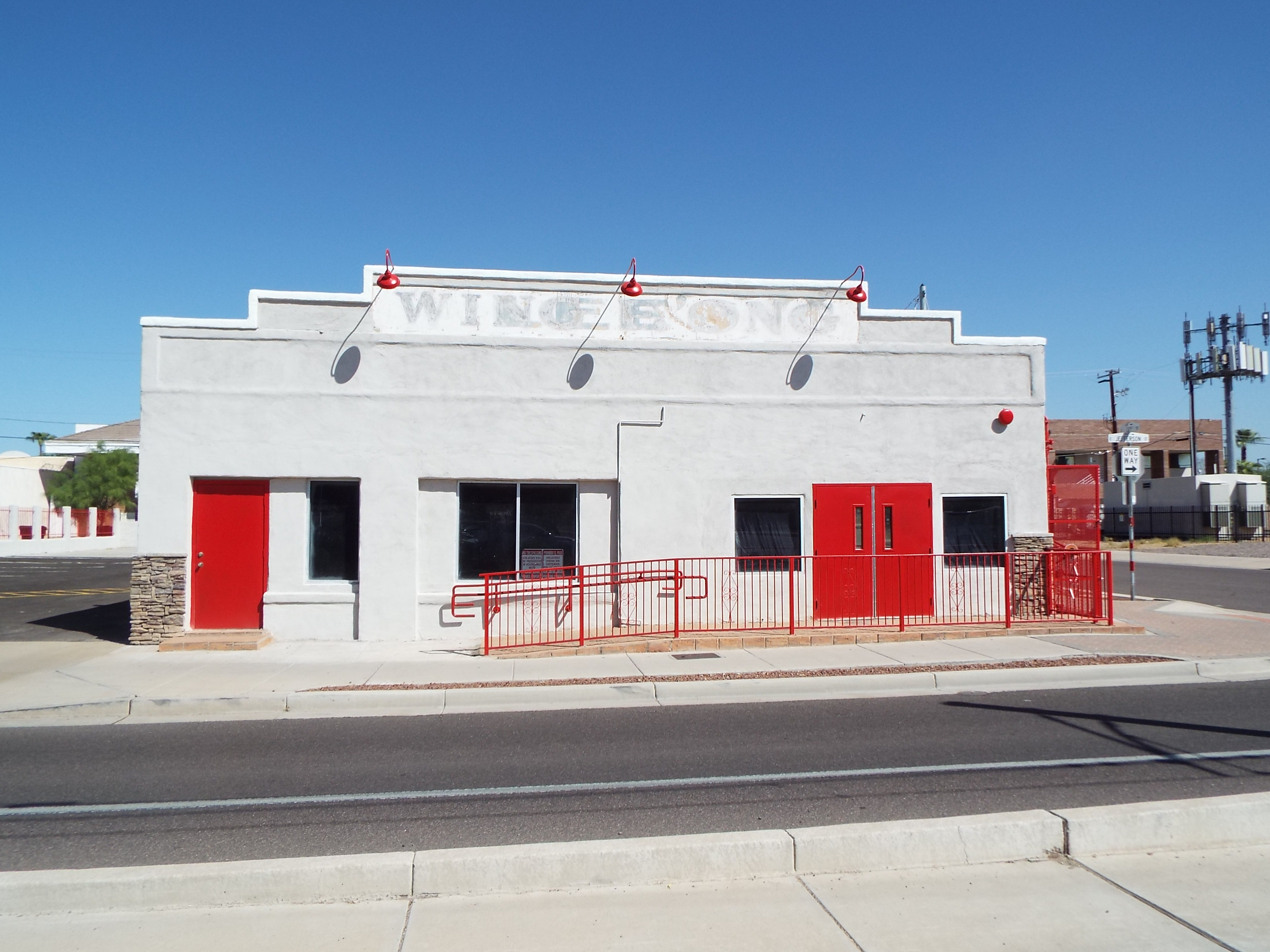
Wing F Wong building, 1246 E. Jefferson St. (a mile east of Chinatown) where Wing Ong operated his store, and later law office

Wing F. Ong became the first Chinese American elected to a state legislature. The Phoenix attorney and businessman won a seat in the Arizona State Senate in 1946. Chinese newspapers in California, Oregon, and Washington covered his election in depth as those states all had significantly larger Chinese populations than Arizona but had never elected a Chinese American to such high office. Graduating first in his 1943 class at the University of Arizona Law School in Tucson, he passed the Arizona Bar Exam and became the eighth Chinese American lawyer in the nation.

From 1940 to 1960, Phoenix's Chinese population more than doubled, but still declined as a percentage of the rapidly growing city. As Phoenix grew, Chinese were moving into new affordable neighborhoods. Then Phoenix City Councilman Thomas Tang, son of Tang Shing, remarked in a 1962 hearing of the United States Commission on Civil Rights that the decentralization of Chinese throughout Phoenix helped the Chinese because "with no such place as Chinatown anymore", Chinese were living amongst their neighbors and known to them "as people, as individuals".

The area was completely redeveloped in the 1980s with the building of American West Arena, home of the Phoenix Suns.

Sing High Chop Suey House opened 1928 and operated from 1956 to 1981 near 3rd St. and Madison. It was forced to relocate due to the development of the arena and remained in business at 27 W. Madison St. until 2018.

== Chinese Cultural Center ==
After nearly 50 years without any centralized location for Chinese business and culture, the Chinese Cultural Center opened in the late 1990s. It was a retail complex built with elements of traditional Chinese architecture. Anchored by a Chinese supermarket, there were also Chinese and other Asian restaurants and businesses. It became a venue for Chinese cultural events including Chinese New Year and Harvest Moon Festival. Developed by COFCO to enhance Phoenix as a place for international Chinese trade and share Chinese culture with the Asian and general community, it failed financially and closed after twenty years despite a fierce battle to save it, conducted primarily by the local Asian community who were unaware of the redevelopment until after COFCO had sold the building.

== Mesa Asian district ==
In the early 2000s, a two-mile (3.2 km) stretch of Dobson Road in Mesa, one of Phoenix's southeastern suburbs, had developed with, as of March 2022, over 70 Asian-themed restaurants, grocery stores, and other businesses on Dobson Road.

Metro Phoenix Chinese/Asian areas
1 Chinatown (c. 1870-1890)
2 Chinatown (c. 1890-1950)
3 Chinese Cultural Center, Phoenix (1997–2017)
4 Mesa Asian district (c. 2000–present)
