= Parviz Kambin =

American-Iranian medical doctor and orthopaedic surgeon (1931–2020)

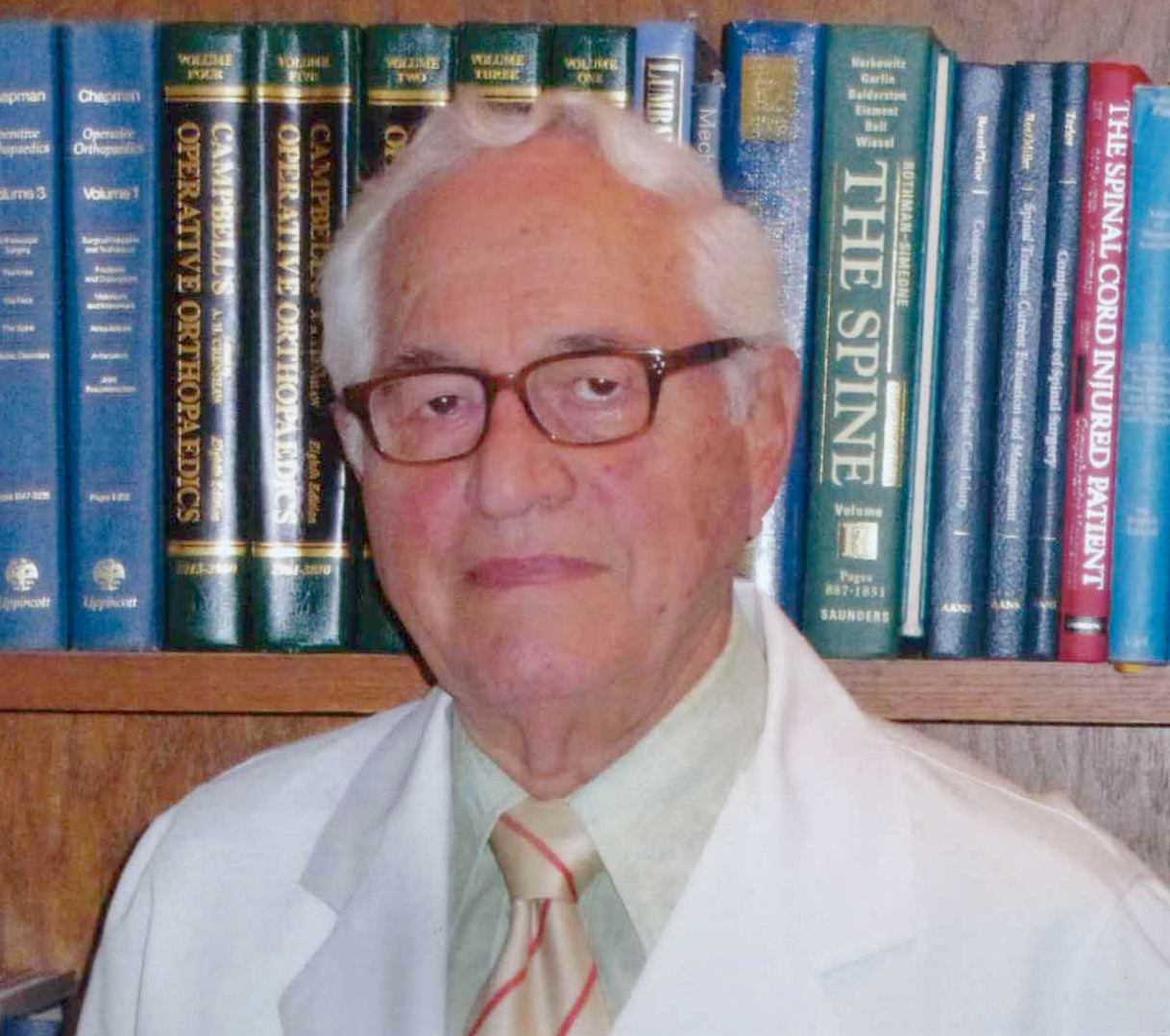
- Born: May 21, 1931; Tehran, Iran
- Died: March 29, 2020 (aged 88); Devon, Pennsylvania, United States
- Medical career
- Profession: Orthopaedic surgeon
- Institutions: Drexel University
- Sub-specialties: Minimally invasive spinal surgery

Parviz Kambin (May 21, 1931 - March 29, 2020) was an American-Iranian medical doctor and orthopaedic surgeon. He was a Professor of Orthopaedic Surgery and has established an Endowed Chair of Spinal Surgery Research at Drexel University College of Medicine. He published more than 55 articles in peer-reviewed journals, edited two textbooks and contributed chapters in spinal surgery textbooks. He lectured worldwide in the field of minimally invasive spinal surgery. His research and development in this specialty began in 1970.

== Biography ==
Kambin was born in Tehran, Iran on May 21, 1931. He received his doctorate degree in medicine from Tehran University Faculty of Medicine in 1956. He continued his post-graduate training as an intern at St. Joseph's Regional Medical Center. He then did a four-year residency at New Jersey Orthopaedic Hospital and New York University, and received his American Board Certification in Orthopaedic Surgery in 1965.

Kambin was a Professor of Orthopaedic Surgery and has established an Endowed Chair of Spinal Surgery at Drexel University, College of Medicine. He was recognized by the College of Physicians of Philadelphia and his work in part has been exhibited in the Mutter Museum. Together with several colleagues, he assisted in the establishment of the International Society for Minimal Intervention in Spinal Surgery in 1988 and was elected the first president of the society in 1990. He coined the term "minimally invasive spinal surgery" and is credited in the Dorland's Medical Dictionary with describing the "Kambin triangular working zone".

== Research and development ==
Parviz Kambin's contributions to the field of spinal surgery have been recognized both in the medical circle and the surgical industry. Kambin's early experimental work with the debulking of the nuclear mass began in 1970. By utilising a series of cadaveric studies at the University of Pennsylvania and the Graduate Hospital, Philadelphia, he developed instruments and described the anatomy and the path of the lateral access to the spinal canal for access and removal of herniated disc fragments.

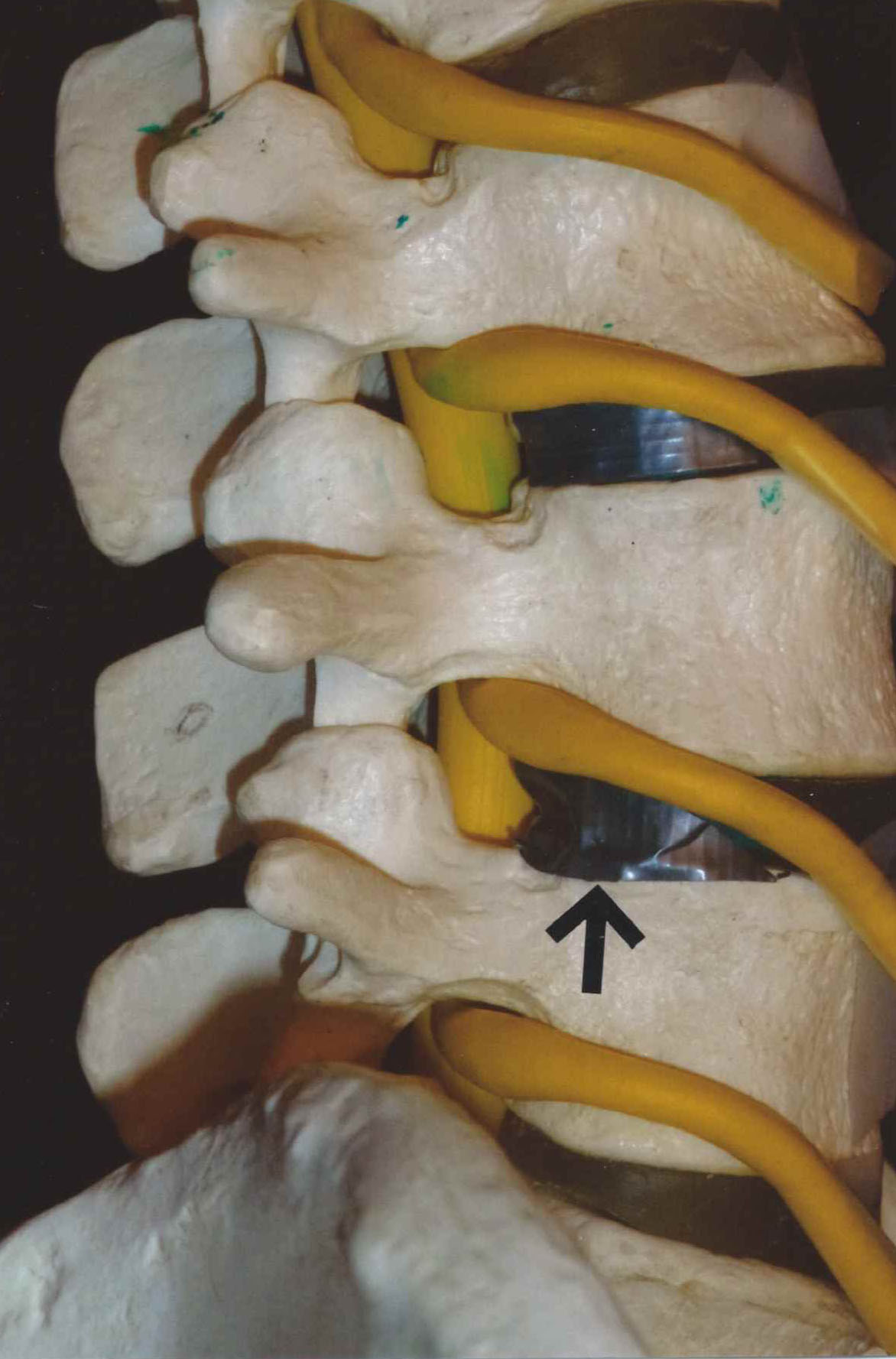
Demonstration of Kambin triangular working zone on a spine model

He subsequently began his experimental work on the efficacy of the postero-lateral access to herniated lumbar discs. Kambin's preliminary study of nine patients who underwent lateral discectomy was published in the peer-reviewed journal Clinical Orthopaedics and Related Research in April 1983, and is considered to be the first publication on this subject in western literature. He is also credited with 34 US and European patents in the field of minimally invasive spinal surgery.

== Awards ==
- The American Academy of Neurological and Orthopaedic Surgeons "Lifetime Achievement Award," July 2000
- The American Academy of Minimally Invasive Spinal Medicine & Surgery "Minimally Invasive Hall of Fame," Las Vegas, Nevada, December 2000
- Royal College of Surgeons, USA "Lifetime Achievement Award", December 2005
- World Congress of Minimally Invasive Spine Surgery & Techniques Lifetime Achievement Award, June 2008

== International activities ==
During a meeting with Adam Schreiber from Switzerland, Mario Brock from the University of Berlin and J.A.N. Shepperd from the UK, a desire to establish an international society dedicated to the research and teaching of the emerging technology was expressed. Dr. Hijikata from Toden Hospital, Japan, had described the removal of nuclear tissue from the intervertebral disc (nucleotomy) for the treatment of herniated discs in 1975. Professor Schreiber adopted this technique and utilized the procedure in his practice. Kambin resisted the term "nucleotomy" in the title of the newly formed society. He believed that the dislodged herniated disc fragments should be accessed and removed. Kambin was elected the first President of the newly organized society. He coined the term "minimal intervention in spinal surgery" by registering the society as a nonprofit organization dedicated to education and research in the Commonwealth of Pennsylvania. The name "International Society for Minimal Intervention in Spinal Surgery" (ISMISS) was established on April 10, 1990. His first textbook, Arthroscopic Microdiscectomy, Minimal Intervention in Spinal Surgery, was published in 1991. The Society was formed under the auspices of the Société Internationale de Chirurgie Orthopédique et de Traumatologie (International Society of Orthopaedic Surgery and Traumatology).

== Teaching ==
Parviz Kambin remained an active member of the Graduate Hospital, where he served patients, taught and did research for more than 30 years. Subsequently, he accepted a full-time academic position at the Drexel University College of Medicine where he continued with his research and patient care. He has also contributed to the Parviz Kambin Lectureship at the Philadelphia Orthopaedic Society, where annually renowned spine surgeons present their work to the Philadelphia orthopaedic community. Norman Johanson, Chairman of Orthopaedic Surgery at Drexel, commented, "Dr. Kambin’s trailblazing work in minimally invasive spine surgery serves as an inspiration to me, the faculty, and the orthopaedic residents here."

== Selected publications ==
- Kambin, P.: Discectomie Percutanee Au Tracer. Abstract Rhumato, Vol. 23 pp 11, September/October 1987.
- Kambin, P: Percutaneous Lumbar Discectomy: Current Practice. Surgical Rounds for Orthopaedics, pp 31–35, December 1988.
- Schaffer, J.L. and Kambin, P.: Percutaneous Posterolateral Lumbar Discectomy and Decompression with a 6.9-Millimeter Cannula. The Journal of Bone and Joint Surgery, Vol. 73-A, No. 6, pp 822–831, July 1991.
- Schaffer, J.L., Kambin P: Percutaneous Posterolateral Lumbar Discectomy and Decompression with a 6.9 Millimeter Cannula: Analysis of Operative failures and Complications. The Year Book of Neurology and Neurosurgery, pp 375–377, 1993.
- Kambin, P., Cohen, L., Brooks, M., and Schaffer, JL: Development of Degenerative Spondylosis of the Lumbar Spine after Partial Discectomy. SPINE Vol. 20, No.5 pp 599–607, March 1995.
- Kambin, P., Casey, K., O'Brien, E., and Zhou, L: Transforaminal arthroscopic decompression of lateral recess stenosis. J Neurosurgery 84: 462-467, 1996.
- Kambin, P. (Moderator) Parke, W, Regan, JJ, Schaffer JL, Yuan, HA: Instructional Course, Minimally Invasive Arthroscopic Spinal Surgery, American Academy of Orthopaedic Surgeons, Annual Meeting, Atlanta, Georgia, February 24, 1996
- Hermantin, F.U., Peters, T., Quartararo, L., Kambin, P: Prospective, Randomized Study Comparing the Results of Open Discectomy with Those of Video-Assisted Arthroscopic Microdiscectomy. The Journal of Bone and Joint Surgery, Vol. 81-A, No. 7, pp 958 –65, July 1999.
