= Epidural lysis of adhesions =

- Other names: Percutaneous adhesiolysis
- Specialty: Neurology

Epidural lysis of adhesions (LOA), also known as percutaneous adhesiolysis or the Racz procedure, is a minimally invasive spine surgery which involves the dissolution of epidural scar tissue by mechanical means to facilitate the spread of analgesics in an effort to alleviate pain. It is a type of percutaneous adhesiolysis procedure commonly used to treat chronic pain resulting from failed back surgery syndrome wherein scar tissue has formed around the nerves and causes pain. Evidence suggests the procedure may also be effective in treating spinal stenosis and radicular pain caused by a herniated disc. (Sometimes hyaluronidase (an enzyme) is also injected to dissolve the adhesions.)

It was developed at Texas Tech University Health Sciences Center (TTUHSC) in 1989 by Gabor B. Racz.

The procedure was assigned a Current Procedural Terminology (CPT) code in 2000.

== Etymology ==
Epidural administration: injection into the epidural space of the spinal cord. Epidural, (Greek): situated on or outside the dura mater, from epi- "on top of" + dura mater + -al. Adhesion (Latin) adhēsiōn- for Latin adhaesiōn- (stem of adhaesiō) a clinging, equivalent to adhaes(us), past participle of adhaerēre to adhere + -iōn- -ion. The act, state or quality of adhering. Lysis, (Greek) lýsis a loosening, releasing; combining form as with adhesiolysis means breaking down, loosening, decomposition.

== Complications ==
While the procedure is effective in removing fibrous tissue in the epidural space, the procedure may create complications. The Racz procedure was only considered after conservative treatments had failed to help patients with low back and cervical pain. According to an evaluation in the Journal of Neuromodulation, "possible known complications include bending of the tip of the introducer needle, shearing/tearing of the catheter, misplacement of the catheter, inadvertent blockage of the catheter or catheter tip, migration of the catheter, hypotension, respiratory depression, urinary and/or fecal incontinence, urinary hesitancy, sexual dysfunction, paresthesia, epidural abscess, and meningitis."

== See also ==
- Epidural anaesthesia
- Epidural steroid injection
