= Minimally invasive thoracic spinal fusion =

- Specialty: Neurosurgery

Minimally invasive thoracic spinal fusion is one of the approaches to scoliosis surgery. Instead of a vertical scar down the back or horizontal from the middle of the chest to the center of the back, a rod is inserted through a series of small incisions on the side of the body. The spine is not exposed during the surgery; a small scope is used instead.

== Terminology ==
- Scoliosis is a three-dimensional curvature of the spine.
- Spinal fusion is when the discs of the spine are removed and replaced with donor bone. The fusion is usually stabilized with a rod.
- Idiopathic means arising spontaneously or from an obscure or unknown cause.

== Qualifications ==
Spinal fusion is usually needed when a curvature reaches 40 degrees. However, there is a window of opportunity for a minimally invasive surgery. The curvature needs to be between 0 and 70 degrees. Minimal rib rotation and only one curve is preferred. Also, minimally invasive spinal fusions are almost always only done in the thoracic region.

== Before operation ==
=== Dietary rules for surgery day ===
Infants 0 to 6 months:

1. No solids the day of surgery
2. Formula or breast milk until four hours before procedure
3. Clear liquids (water, apple juice, flat 7-up, Pedialyte) until three hours before procedure
4. Nothing by mouth thereafter

Children 7 months and older:
A. No solids the day of surgery;
B. Formula or breast milk until 6 hours before procedure;
C. Clear liquids (water, apple juice, flat 7-up, Pedialyte) until three hours before the procedure;
D. Nothing by mouth thereafter.

When the patient arrives at the hospital vital signs will be taken. Also, if needed lab work will be done. The patient will then be moved to a holding room with their family. A nurse will then place the patient on a gurney and they will then be wheeled into the operating room. The anesthesiologist will then put the patient to sleep.

== Procedure ==
Once in the operating room and asleep, a catheter and IV's are inserted. Since the spine is not being exposed, a scope is inserted into the body. The scope has a tiny camera on the end of it and this lets the surgeon watch the surgery as he performs it on a television. Usually, about five, one inch incisions are made and one 5-inch incision across the back of the hip. The lung is deflated and pushed aside, and a breathing tube is inserted into the deflated lung to help assist the patient in breathing. Once the lung is aside the surgeon removes the amount of discs needed for the fusion. Each patient is different in the number of discs needed to be removed. Bone from the patient's hip is then inserted right where the discs used to be. Screws are then inserted along the spine from the inside of the rib cage. These screws act as anchors for the rod. A rod is then inserted through the holes in the head of the screws. This is done slowly as to not aggravate the spinal cord. The lung is re-inflated and the breathing tube removed. However, a drain tube is inserted to drain excess liquid from the lungs. The patient is then moved to the Intensive Care Unit and then to a recovery room.

== After operation ==
Diet: Clear liquids, clear soup, popsicles and juice. Then slowly from liquids to foods over a 24-hour time span.
Nausea and vomiting: Very common after surgery, usually due to the anesthesia.
Pain: The patient is given morphine intravenously to manage pain. The use of a pain assessment tool is helpful for a patient to communicate their pain levels to a nurse or doctor.
Walking: Walking usually occurs within 48 hours of surgery. However, it should not be rushed and is completely up to the patient.

=== Tube removal ===
A. The stomach tube is usually removed once the patient has been moved to the recovery room.
B. The catheter is usually removed as soon as the patient feels good enough to walk around. Most likely around the second or third day.
C. The lung drain tube is usually removed last or once the flow has slowed greatly or completely stopped.
D. IV's are removed usually on the 4th or 5th day. Once the patient is able to take pain medication orally

== Medication ==
- Hydrocodone
- Acetaminophen
- Vicodin

== Recovery and outcome ==
After being discharged from the hospital the patient will be required to wear a back brace for the first three months after surgery. After nine months to a year a patient will be able to resume all normal activity. Unlike other spinal fusions, with a minimally invasive thoracic spinal fusion only about 10 percent of mobility is lost. This lost mobility is usually in trunk rotation. This surgery is designed to let a person still have about the same flexibility as he or she did before the surgery. However, this means that full correction will not be able to be achieved. A person will still be slightly "bent" after the surgery is performed.

== Alternatives ==
- Harrington Implant
