= Nucleotomy =

- Specialty: Orthopedic

Nucleotomy is a surgical procedure for removal of tissue surrounding a herniated disk.
