= Anterior cervical discectomy and fusion =

Surgical procedure

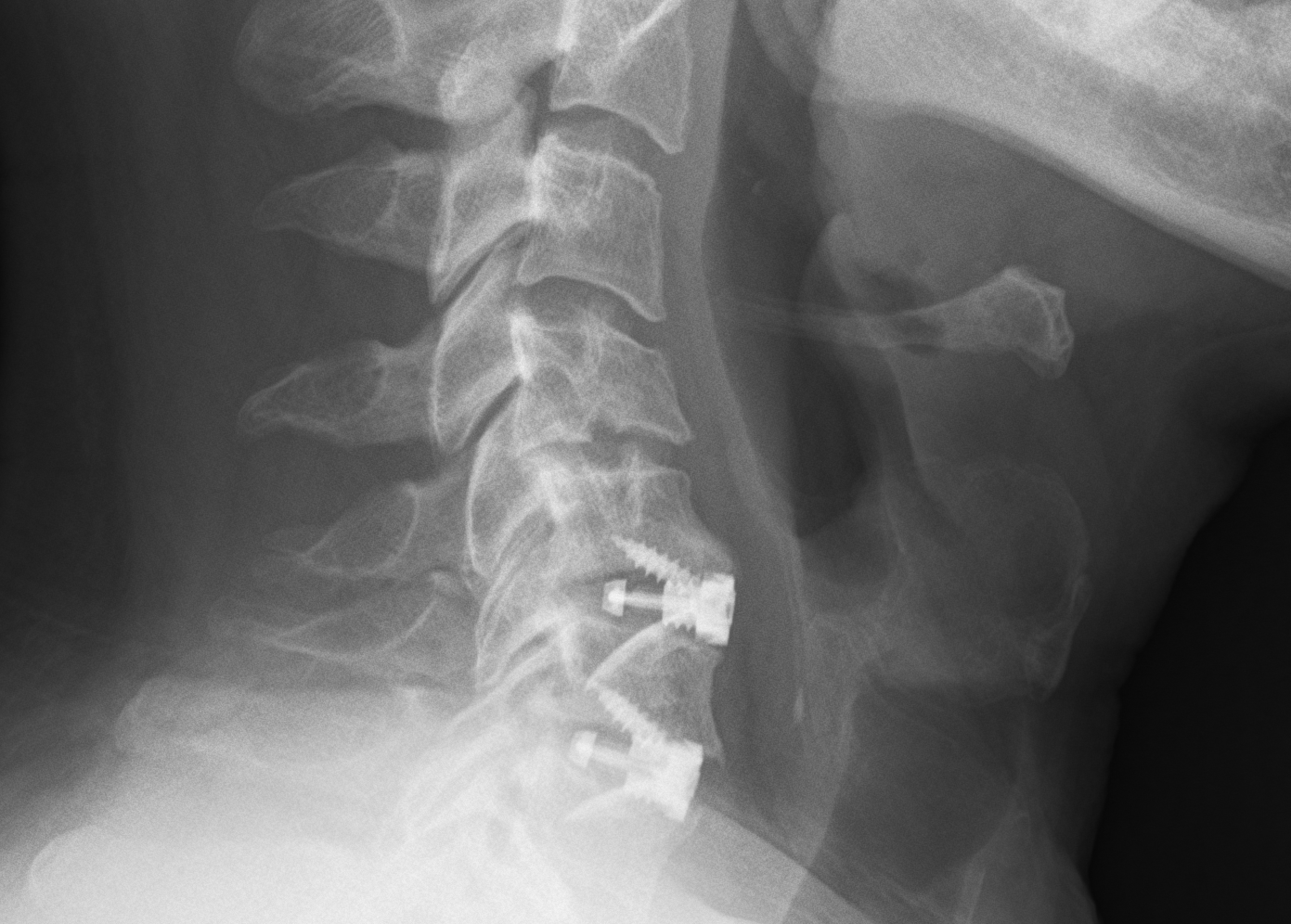
- X-rays of anterior cervical discectomy and fusion, C5C6 and C6C7. Lateral view.
- Specialty: Neurosurgery

Anterior cervical discectomy and fusion (ACDF) is a surgical procedure to treat nerve root or spinal cord compression by decompressing the spinal cord and nerve roots of the cervical spine with a discectomy, followed by inter-vertebral fusion to stabilize the corresponding vertebrae. This procedure is used when other non-surgical treatments have failed.

== Medical uses ==
ACDF is used to treat serious pain from a nerve root that has become inflamed. This can be caused by:

- A herniated disc when other non-surgical treatments have failed. The nucleus pulposus (the jelly-like center of the disc) of the herniated disc bulges out through the annulus (surrounding wall) and presses on the nerve root next to it.
- Degenerative disc disease (spondylosis). The disc consists of about 80% water. When one grows older, the disc starts to dry out and shrink, causing small tears in the annulus and inflammation of the nerve root.

== Contraindications ==
Bone morphogenetic protein (rhBMP) should not be routinely used in any type of anterior cervical spine fusion, such as with anterior cervical discectomy and fusion. There are reports of this therapy causing swelling of soft tissue which in turn can cause life-threatening complications due to difficulty swallowing and pressure on the respiratory tract.

== Technique ==
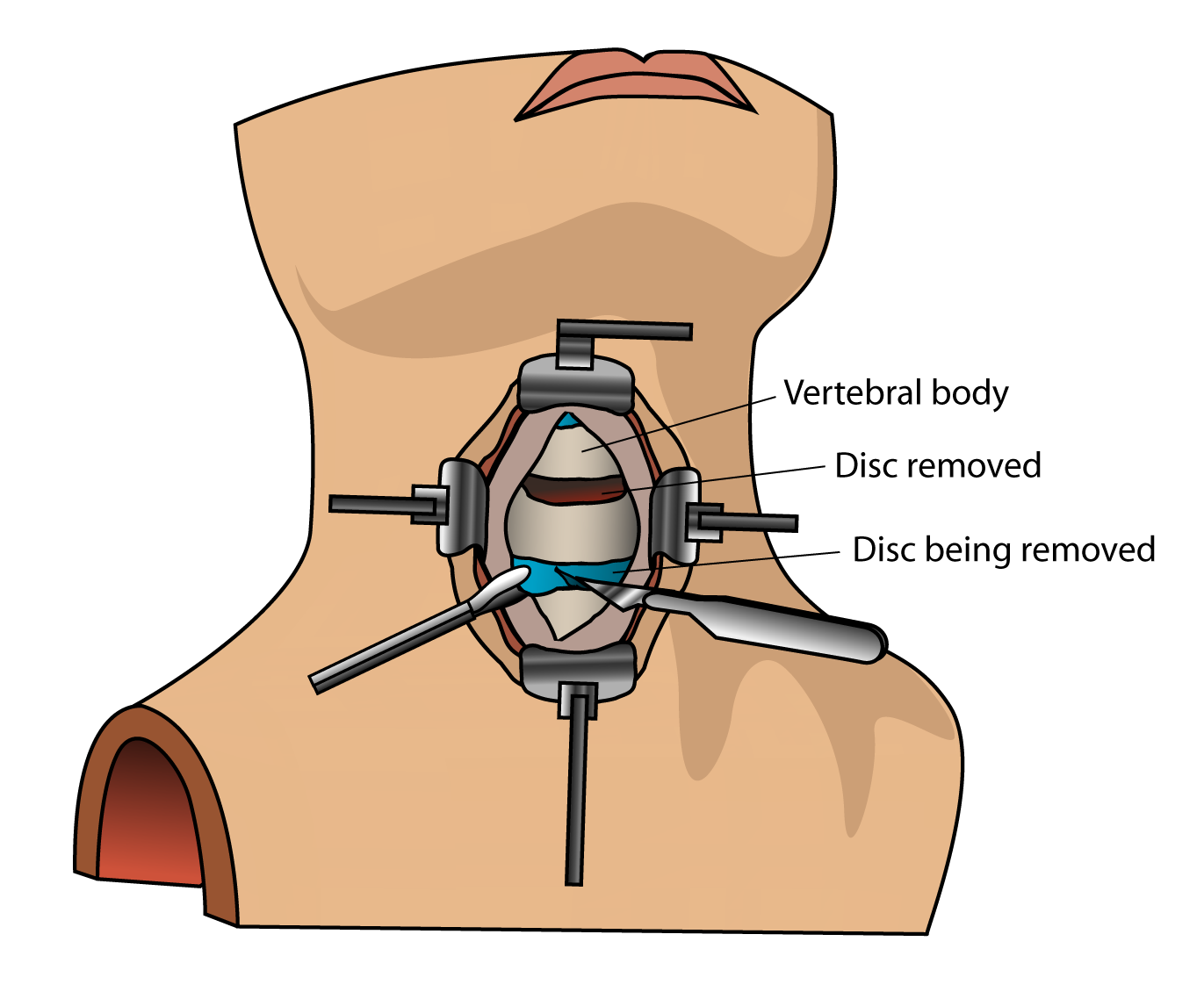
Anterior cervical discectomy

The neurosurgeon or orthopedic surgeon enters the space between two discs through a small incision in front (= anterior) of and at the right or left side of the neck. The disc is completely removed, as well as arthritic bone spurs. The disc material, pressing on the spinal nerve or spinal cord, is then completely removed. The intervertebral foramen, the bone channel through which the spinal nerve runs, is then enlarged with a drill giving the nerve more room to exit the spinal canal.

To prevent the vertebrae from collapsing and to increase stability, the open space is often filled with a graft. That can be a bone graft, taken from the pelvis or cadaveric bone; or an artificial implant. New synthetic bone grafts are continuously developed and tested. The slow process of the bone graft joining the vertebrae together is called "fusion". Sometimes a titanium plate is screwed on the vertebrae or screws are used between the vertebrae to increase stability during fusion, especially when there is more than one disc involved.

Apart from open approach, recently full endoscopic approach for ACDF has also been described.

== Recovery ==
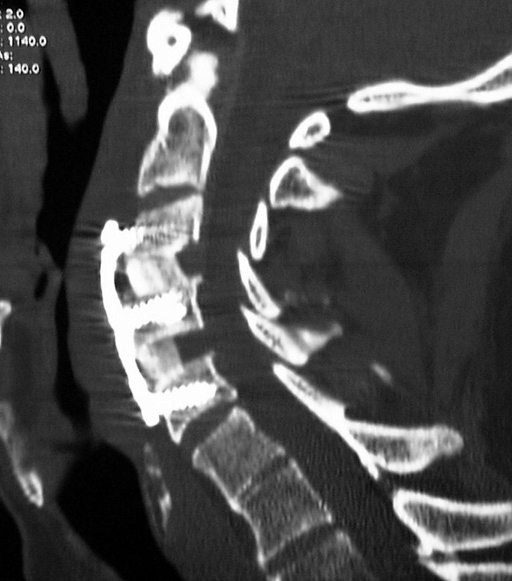
CT scan of a patient after two-level anterior cervical discectomy and fusion (ACDF) with allograft

The surgery requires a short stay in the clinic (1 to 3 days) and a gradual recovery between 1 and 6 weeks. However, the technology has advanced, and it can be performed by endoscopic micro discectomy, with the patient able to continue their normal life in two days. The patient may be advised to wear a neck brace or collar (for up to 8 weeks) that serves to ensure proper spinal alignment. Wearing the brace heightens one's awareness of posture and positioning and helps prevent movements (e.g., sudden and/or excessive bending or twisting of the neck) that may aggravate or slow down the healing process.

It is especially advisable to wear a protective neck brace when traveling (e.g., by car), sleeping, showering, or any other activities in which the patient may not be able to be ensure proper spinal alignment. In addition, physical therapy and related healing modalities (e.g., massage, acupuncture) may be recommended in order to promote proper healing, as well as to strengthen the surrounding muscles that can take over the neck brace's 'job' of ensuring proper spinal alignment when the patient starts (around 4 to 6 weeks after surgery) to wean off the neck brace.
