= Microsurgical lumbar laminoplasty =

- Specialty: Orthopedic (or neurology)

Microsurgical lumbar laminoplasty is a minimally invasive technique for decompressing pinched nerves in the lumbar spine. Pinched or compressed nerves may result from herniated discs, lumbar spinal stenosis, or spondylolisthesis.

The traditional technique for decompression of lumbar nerves is laminectomy, a surgical procedure developed in the early 1900s. In laminectomy, the paraspinal muscles are dissected off the spine bilaterally, that is on the left and right sides of the spinal column. The lamina and spinous process are then removed to gain access to the nerves contained within the spinal canal. The structures that are compressing the nerves (usually ligamentum flavum and herniated disc) are then trimmed until the nerves are free from compression. Laminectomy is an effective procedure for relieving pressure on spinal nerves, but during the procedure, many spinal stabilizing structures are destroyed even though they are not directly compressing the nerves (lamina, spinous process, interspinous ligament, supraspinous ligament). The reason for that is that these structures are "in the way," that is they block the surgeon's access to the spinal canal. In some patients, excessive spinal destabilization and muscle damage from laminectomy results in "postlaminectomy syndrome." This medical condition is characterized by chronic back pain and weakness.

During the 1980s, spinal surgeons began to use operating microscopes in order to improve visualization of the spinal nerves during surgery. The use of the operating microscope in spinal surgery allows the procedure to be performed through a smaller incision and with greater safety because the surgeon's visualization of nerve tissue is improved. Around this time, Dr. John A. McCulloch developed a technique for decompressing spinal nerves while minimizing the amount of "collateral damage" to supporting spinal ligaments, bones, and muscles. In contrast to traditional laminectomy, the lamina, spinous process, inter- and supraspinous ligaments are preserved. Also, the spinal musculature is dissected away from the spinal bones only on one side, rather than on the left and right sides.

Despite the fact that microsurgical lumbar laminoplasty is an effective and less-invasive method for decompressing spinal nerves compared to traditional laminectomy, few surgeons have adopted it because the technique is more time-consuming and requires specialized training and equipment (operating microscope).

Practitioners of microsurgical lumbar laminoplasty include Dr. Nima Salari of Desert Institute for Spine Care (Phoenix, Arizona), Dr. Russel C. Huang of the Hospital for Special Surgery (New York, NY), Dr. K. Daniel Riew of Washington University in St. Louis, Dr. Bradley K. Weiner (Akron, OH), and Dr. David A. Wong of the Denver Spine Center (Denver, CO).
