= Sun Mercantile Building =

- U.S. National Register of Historic Places
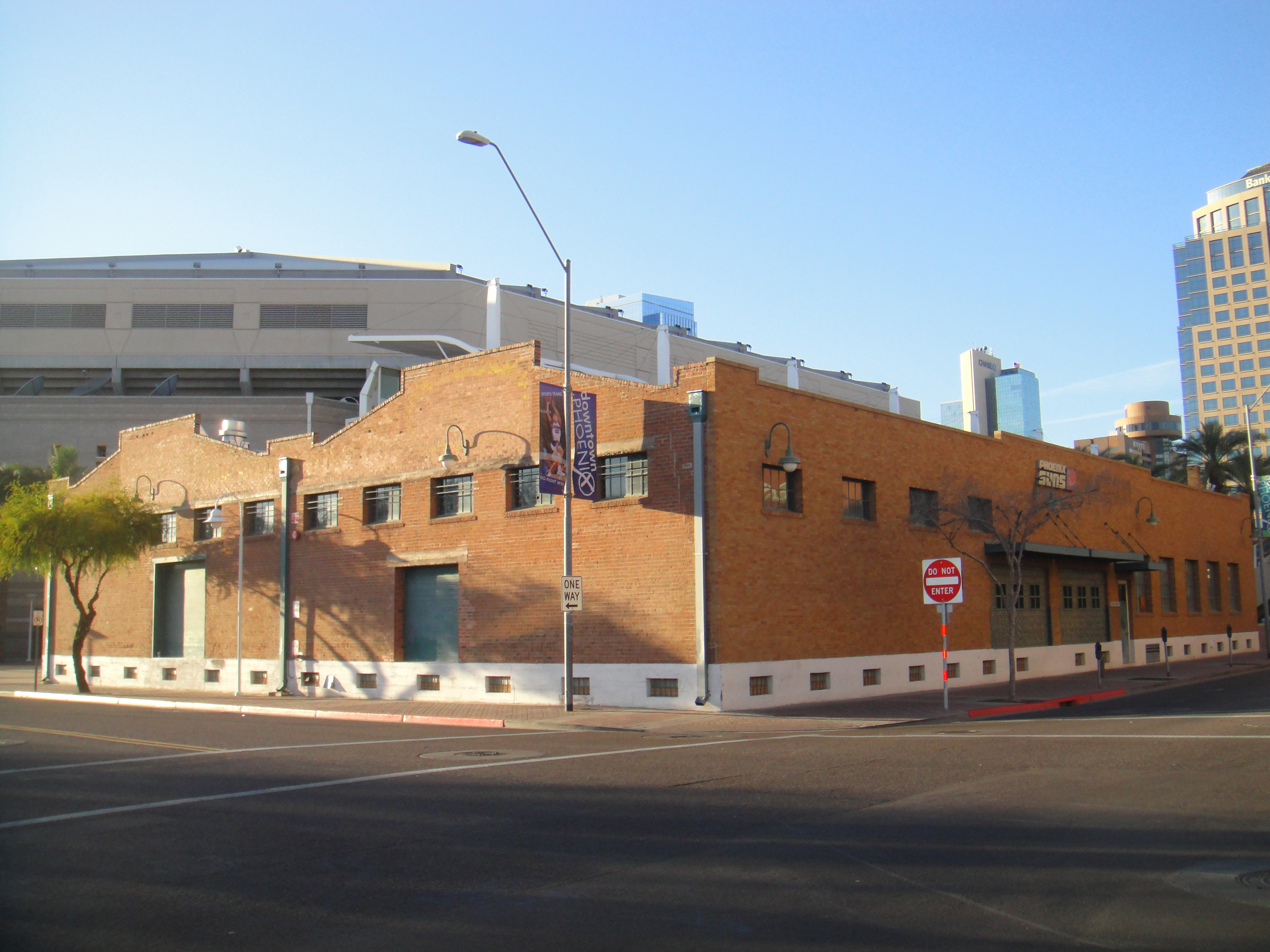
- The Sun Mercantile Building in Downtown Phoenix.

- Location within Arizona Location within the United States
- Location: 232 South 3rd Street; Phoenix, AZ
- Coordinates: 33°26′43″N 112°4′13″W
- Built: 1929
- Architect: E.W. Bacon; Wells & Sons
- Architectural style: Chicago
- MPS: Phoenix Commercial MRA
- NRHP reference No.: 85002075
- Added to NRHP: September 4, 1985

The Sun Mercantile Building (or "Sun Merc") is a warehouse building in Phoenix, Arizona designed by E.W. Bacon and constructed by Wells & Son in 1929.

It was listed on the National Register of Historic Places in 1985 and has been a locally protected historic landmark since 1987.

== History ==
Sun Merc is the last remaining building from Phoenix's "second Chinatown" period (c. 1890 – c. 1960). It is located directly next to the Talking Stick Resort Arena and is used by the Phoenix Suns.

=== Preservation threat ===
In the mid-2000s, plans were proposed to build a new $200 million luxury high-rise hotel and condominium tower, part of which would be atop the Sun Mercantile Building tearing off the roof and preserving only the base. Historic preservationists and the city's Asian-American community voiced their disapproval of the plans. However, the city council did not agree and the project was given the go ahead. A lawsuit was then filed in court and in the fall of 2007 a judge ruled that "the Phoenix City Council had improper talks with Sarver (the developer) before it decided the fate of the warehouse on the hotel site." and the project was effectively dead.
