= List of eponymous surgical procedures =

Eponymous surgical procedures are generally named after the surgeon or surgeons who performed or reported them first. In some instances they are named after the surgeon who popularised them or refined existing procedures, and occasionally are named after the patient who first underwent the procedure.

| Procedure | Name | Field | Description | External link or reference |
|---|---|---|---|---|
| Anderson-Hynes pyeloplasty | James Christie Anderson, Wilfred Hynes | Urology | Dismembered type of pyeloplasty used to treat stricture of the uretero-pelvic junction | |
| Bankart repair | Arthur Bankart | Orthopaedic surgery | Procedure to treat recurrent shoulder dislocation by suturing the joint capsule to the glenoid labrum | Bankart's operation at Whonamedit? |
| Belsey fundoplication | Ronald Herbert Robert Belsey | Upper gastrointestinal surgery | Fundoplication with 240° wrap | "Belsey mark iv fundoplication". Medcyclopaedia. GE. |
| Bentall's procedure | Hugh Bentall | Cardiothoracic surgery | Composite graft replacement of the aortic valve, aortic root and ascending aorta, with re-implantation of thecoronary arteries into the graft | |
| Bier's block | August Bier | Anesthesiology | Intravenous regional anesthesia. Usually used for short upper limb surgeries. | |
| Billroth's operation I | Theodor Billroth | Upper gastrointestinal surgery | Resection of the pyloric antrum and end-to-end anastomosis of the gastric remnant to the duodenum | Billroth's operation I at Whonamedit? |
| Billroth's operation II | Theodor Billroth | Upper gastrointestinal surgery | Resection of the pyloric antrum and side-to-side anastomosis of the gasstric remnant to the jejunum | Billroth's operation II at Whonamedit? |
| Blalock–Hanlon shunt | Alfred Blalock, C. Rollins Hanlon | Paediatric surgery | Palliative atrial septostomy to treat infants with complete transposition of the great arteries | Blalock-Hanlon operation at Whonamedit? |
| Blalock–Taussig shunt | Alfred Blalock, Helen B. Taussig | Paediatric surgery | Palliative surgical procedure to treat infants with cyanotic heart defects | Blalock-Taussig operation at Whonamedit? |
| Burrow's triangle excision | Karl August von Burrow | Reconstructive surgery | Triangles of skin adjacent to a sliding flap are excised to facilitate movement of the flap | |
| Collis gastroplasty | John Leigh Collis, British cardiothoracic surgeon | Upper gastrointestinal surgery | Procedure for lengthening oesophagus | COLLIS JL (September 1957). "An operation for hiatus hernia with short oesophagus". Thorax. 12 (3): 181–8. doi:10.1136/thx.12.3.181. PMC 1019207. PMID 13467876. |
| Dor fundoplication | Dor | Upper gastrointestinal surgery | Partial fundoplication with 180° anterior wrap | Dor fundoplication at Medilexicon.com |
| Finney pyloroplasty | Finney 1902 | Upper gastrointestinal surgery | | |
| Foley operation | Frederic Foley | Urology | Pyeloplasty performed to treat stricture of the uretero-pelvic junction | Foley's plastic at Whonamedit? |
| Fontan procedure | François Fontan | Pediatric surgery | Palliative procedure used to treat complex congenital heart defects in children | Fontan's operation at Whonamedit? |
| Gavriliu's operation | Dan Gavriliu | Upper gastrointestinal surgery | Procedure to replace or bypass the esophagus with part of the stomach | Gavriliu's operation at Whonamedit? |
| Gillies lift | Harold Gillies | Maxillofacial Surgery | Procedure to lift depressed fractured zygoma via temporal approach | |
| Gundersen flap | Trygve Gundersen | Ophthalmology | Procedure to replace a damaged section of cornea with part of the conjunctiva | |
| Hadfield's procedure | Geoffrey John Hadfield | Oncologic Surgery, Breast surgery | Surgical removal (excision) of all lactiferous ducts of the breast for managing duct ectasia. | |
| Halsted's operation (hernia) | William Stewart Halsted | General surgery | Repair of inguinal hernia | Halsted's operation I at Whonamedit? |
| Halsted's operation (mastectomy) | William Stewart Halsted | Breast surgery | Radical mastectomy for the treatment of breast cancer | Halsted's operation II at Whonamedit? |
| Hartmann's operation | Henri Albert Hartmann | Colorectal surgery | Resection of the rectosigmoid colon with closure of the rectal stump and formation of a colostomy | Hartmann's operation at Whonamedit? |
| Heineke–Mikulicz pyloroplasty | Hermann Heineke, Jan Mikulicz-Radecki | Upper gastrointestinal surgery | | |
| Heller myotomy | Ernest Heller | Upper gastrointestinal surgery | Procedure in which the lower oesophageal sphincter is cut to allow passage of food into the stomach in patients with achalasia | Heller E (1913). "Extramucose Cardiaplastik beim chronischen Cardiospasmus mit Dilatation des Oesophagus". Mitteil Grenzgeb Med Chir. 27: 141. |
| Homans operation | John Homans | Vascular surgery | Ligation of the femoral vein to prevent pulmonary embolism in patients with deep venous thrombosis | Homans' operation at Whonamedit? |
| Ivor Lewis oesophagoastrectomy | Ivor Lewis (1895–1982) | Upper gastrointestinal surgery | Trans-thoracic removal of the oesophagus and part of the stomach to treat cancer of the oesophagus and gastro-oesophageal junction | T.J. Crofts (October 2000). "Ivor-Lewis oesophagectomy for middle and lower third oesophageal lesions - how we do it". J.R.Coll.Surg.Edinb. 45 (5): 296–303. PMID 11077777. Archived from the original on 2010-04-12. |
| Jaboulay's pyloroplasty | Mathieu Jaboulay | Upper gastrointestinal surgery | Pyloroplasty by forming a side-to-side gastroduodenal anastomosis | Jaboulay's pyloroplasty at Whonamedit? |
| Jaboulay–Winkelmann operation | Mathieu Jaboulay, Karl Winkelmann (1863 – 1925) | Urology | Excision of tunica vaginalis to treat hydrocele testis | Jabouley–Winkelmann operation at Whonamedit? |
| Kasai procedure | Morio Kasai | Paediatric surgery | A gastrointestinal tract surgery to treat infants with biliary atresia | |
| Kausch–Whipple procedure | Walther Kausch, Allen Whipple | Upper gastrointestinal surgery | Radical pancreaticoduodenectomy used to treat cancer of the head of the pancreas | Kausch–Whipple operation at Whonamedit? |
| Keller's excision arthroplasty | William L. Keller | Orthopaedic surgery | Proximal third of proximal phalanx is excised in Hallux valgus | |
| Killian's operation | Gustav Killian | Otolaryngology | Operation to treat frontal sinusitis | Killian's operation at Whonamedit? |
| Ladd's procedure | William Ladd | Upper gastrointestinal surgery | Done for small intestinal malrotation. | |
| Lisfranc's amputation | Jacques Lisfranc de St. Martin | Orthopaedic surgery | Partial foot amputation through the tarsometatarsal joint | Lisfranc's amputation at Whonamedit? |
| Lord's procedure for haemorrhoids | Peter H. Lord | Colorectal surgery | Digital anal dilatation under general anaesthetic to treat haemorrhoids or anal fissure | Lord's procedure for haemorrhoids at Whonamedit? |
| Lord's procedure for hydrocele | Peter H. Lord | Urology | Incision and eversion of the tunica vaginalis to treat hydrocele testis | Lord's procedure at Whonamedit? |
| Mayo Repair | | General Surgery | Repair of Umblical hernia Double breasted (Vast over Trouser) | |
| Miles operation | William Ernest Miles | Colorectal surgery | Abdominoperineal resection of the rectum to treat rectal cancer | Miles'operation at Whonamedit? |
| Mohs surgery | Frederic E. Mohs | Dermatology surgery | Microscopically controlled surgery to treat common skin cancers, most often basal cell carcinoma and squamous cell carcinoma | MOHS Surgery at Whonamedit? |
| Nissen fundoplication | Rudolph Nissen | Upper gastrointestinal surgery, laparoscopic surgery | Gastric fundus is wrapped fully around the lower oesophagus to treat gastroesophageal reflux disease | Nissen's fundoplication at Whonamedit? |
| Paul's operation | Frank Thomas Paul (1851–1941) | Colorectal surgery | Extra-abdominal resection of colon | |
| Phemister graft | Dallas B. Phemister | Bone graft | Method of bone graft which uses bone tissue harvested from the patient to treat slow-healing, or delayed union bone fractures. | |
| Polya gastrectomy | Eugen Pólya | Upper gastrointestinal surgery | Partial gastrectomy with posterior gastrojejunostomy, a modification of the Billroth II operation | Polya's operation at Whonamedit? |
| Ramstedt's pyloromyotomy | Wilhelm Ramstedt | Upper gastrointestinal surgery | Splits hypertrophic muscle and leaves mucosa intact in Infantile hypertrophic pyloric stenosis | |
| Roux-en-Y anastomosis | César Roux | Upper gastrointestinal surgery | End-to-side anastomosis between cut end of small bowel and distal small bowel | Roux' operation at Whonamedit? |
| Sistrunk procedure | Walter Sistrunk | Otorhinolaryngology | Surgical management option for thyroglossal cyst. Complete excision of thyroglossal tract with removal of hyoid and suprahyoid tract. | |
| Smith's operation | Henry Smith | Ophthalmology | Removal of intact immature cataract from within the lens (i.e. intracapsular cataract removal) | Smith's operation at Whonamedit? |
| Syme's amputation | James Syme | Orthopaedic surgery | Amputation of the foot at the ankle with removal of the malleoli | Syme's amputation at Whonamedit? |
| Tommy John surgery | Tommy John | Orthopaedic surgery | Ulnar collateral ligament reconstruction | Named after the Major League Baseball pitcher who was the first professional athlete to undergo the procedure, in 1974. |
| Toupet fundoplication | Andre Toupet | Upper gastrointestinal surgery | Fundoplication with 270° posterior wrap | Laparoscopy Hospital article |
| Trendelenburg's operation | Friedrich Trendelenburg | Cardiothoracic surgery | Pulmonary embolectomy for the treatment of pulmonary embolism | Trendelenburg's operation at Whonamedit? |
| Wertheim's operation | Ernst Wertheim | Gynaecology | Radical abdominal hysterectomy used to treat cervical cancer | Wertheim's operation at Whonamedit? |
| Whipple's procedure | Allen Whipple | Upper gastrointestinal surgery | Radical pancreaticoduodenectomy used to treat cancer of the head of the pancreas | Kausch–Whipple operation at Whonamedit? |
