= List of eponymous medical devices =

Some medical devices are named after persons.

| Device | Name | Specialty | Description | External link (if no internal link) |
|---|---|---|---|---|
| Adson's forceps | Alfred Washington Adson | General use | Tissue forceps | Adson-Graefe forceps at Whonamedit? |
| Allis clamp | Oscar Huntington Allis | General use | Soft tissue clamp | Allis' tweezers or clamp at Whonamedit? |
| Arruga forceps | Hermenegildo Arruga | Ophthalmology | Forceps used for intracapsular removal of cataracts | Arruga forceps at Whonamedit? |
| Asch's septum forceps | Morris Joseph Asch | Otolaryngology | Forceps used to reduce deviated nasal septum | Corry J. Kucik, LT, MC, USN; Timothy Clenney, CDR, MC, USN, and James Phelan, CDR, MC, USN, Naval Hospital Jacksonville, Jacksonville, Florida (2004-10-01). "Management of Acute Nasal Fractures". Am Fam Physician. 70 (7): 1315–1320. PMID 15508543. |
| Auvard's speculum | Alfred Auvard | Gynaecology | vaginal speculum | |
| Luer taper, Luer lock | Hermann Wülfing Luer | General use | Fitting to ensure leak-free connection in medical fluid administration systems | |
| Penrose drain | Charles Bingham Penrose | Surgery | Tube allowing for postoperative drainage from surgical sites | |
