= Phemister =

Phemister is a surname. Notable people with the surname include:

- Dallas B. Phemister (1882–1951), American surgeon and researcher
  - Phemister graft, a type of bone graft
- James Phemister (1893–1986), Scottish geologist
- Thomas Phemister (1902–1982), Scottish geologist
- Alexander Phemister (1829-1894), Scottish punch cutter
  - Bookman Old Style
