= Eponym =

Person or thing after which something is named

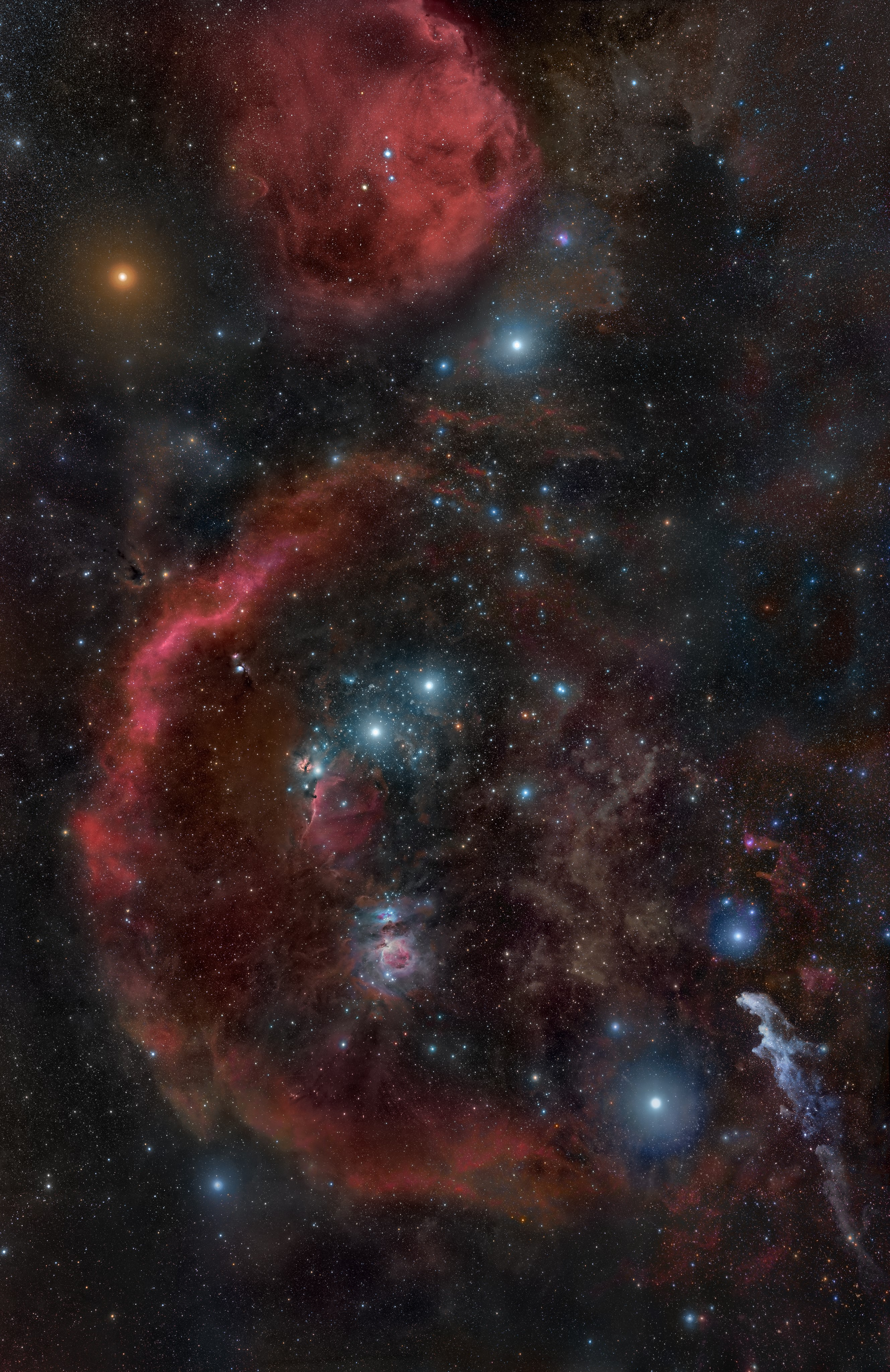
The mythological Greek hero Orion is the eponym of the constellation Orion, shown here, and thus indirectly of the Orion spacecraft.

An eponym is a person or thing after which someone or something is named. For example, John Montagu, 4th Earl of Sandwich, is the eponym of the sandwich. Adjectives derived from the word eponym include eponymous and eponymic.

Eponyms are commonly used for time periods, places, innovations, biological nomenclature, astronomical objects, works of art and media, and tribal names. Various orthographic conventions are used for eponyms.

== Usage of the word ==
The term eponym functions in multiple related ways, all based on an explicit relationship between named people, places or things. Eponym refers to a person, a place or a thing after which someone or something is named; or that someone or something. Such things share an eponymous relationship. In this way, Elizabeth I of England is the eponym of the Elizabethan era, but the Elizabethan era can also be referred to as the eponym of Elizabeth I of England. Eponyms may be named for things or places, for example Downing Street in London is named for Sir George Downing, who had the houses built there as an investment: However, Downing never lived in his eponymous street. Adjectives and verbs may be eponyms, for example bowdlerize.

Adjectives derived from the word eponym include eponymous and eponymic. When Henry Ford is referred to as "the eponymous founder of the Ford Motor Company", his surname "Ford" and the name of the motor company have an eponymous relationship. The word "eponym" can also refer to the title character of a fictional work (such as Rocky Balboa of the Rocky film series), as well as to self-titled works named after their creators (such as the album The Doors by the band the Doors).

Walt Disney created the eponymous Walt Disney Company, with his name similarly extended to theme parks such as Walt Disney World. Medical eponymous terms are often called medical eponyms, regardless of that usage being deprecated by those speakers who wish to reserve the term eponym to the person.

== History ==
Periods have often been named after a ruler or other influential figure:

- One of the first recorded cases of eponymy occurred in the second millennium BC, when the Assyrians named each year after a high official (limmu).
- In ancient Greece, the eponymous archon was the highest magistrate in classical Athens. Eponymous archons served a term of one year which took the name of that particular archon (e.g., 594 BC was named after Solon). Later historians provided yet another case of eponymy by referring to the period of fifth-century Athens as The Age of Pericles after its most influential statesman Pericles.
- In Ptolemaic Egypt, the head priest of the Cult of Alexander and the Ptolemies was the eponymous priest after whom years were named.
- The Hebrew Bible explains the origins of peoples through individuals who bear their name. Jacob is renamed "Israel" (Gen 35:9) and his sons (or grandsons) name the original 12 tribes of Israel, while Edomites (Gen. 25:30), Moabites and Ammonites (Gen. 19:30-38), Canaanites (Gen. 9:20-27) and other tribes (the Kenites named after Cain (Cain's life is detailed in Gen. 4:1-16)) are said to be named after other primal ancestors bearing their name. In most cases, the experiences and behavior of the ancestor is meant to indicate the characteristics of the people who take their name.
- In ancient Rome, one of the two formal ways of indicating a year was to cite the two annual consuls who served in that year. For example, the year we know as 59 BC would have been described as "the consulship of Marcus Calpurnius Bibulus and Gaius Julius Caesar" (although that specific year was known jocularly as "the consulship of Julius and Caesar" because of the insignificance of Caesar's counterpart). Under the empire, the consuls would change as often as every two months, but only the two consuls at the beginning of the year would lend their names to that year.
- During the Christian era, itself eponymous, many royal households used eponymous dating by regnal years. The Roman Catholic Church, however, eventually used the Anno Domini dating scheme - based on the birth of Christ - on both the general public and royalty. The regnal year standard is still used with respect to statutes and law reports published in some parts of the United Kingdom and in some Commonwealth countries (England abandoned this practice in 1963).
- Government administrations may become referred to eponymously, such as Kennedy's Camelot and the Nixon Era.
- British monarchs have become eponymous throughout the English-speaking world for time periods, fashions, etc. Elizabethan, Georgian, Victorian, and Edwardian are examples of these.

Trends

- Political trends or movements are often named after a government leader. Examples include Jacksonian democracy, Stalinism, Maoism, Obamacare, and Thatcherism.

== Other eponyms ==
- In intellectual property law, an eponym can be a generic trademark or brand name, a form of metonymy, such as aspirin, heroin and thermos in the United States.
- In geography, places can have an eponymous name through a relationship to an important figure. Peloponnesus, for instance, was said to derive its name from the Greek hero Pelops. In historical times, new towns have often been named (and older communities renamed) after their founders, discoverers, or notable individuals. Examples include Vancouver, British Columbia, named after explorer George Vancouver; and Prince Albert, Saskatchewan, originally called Isbister's Settlement but renamed after Prince Albert of Saxe-Coburg and Gotha in 1866.
- In science and technology:
  - Discoveries and innovations are often named after the discoverer or a figure influential in their advance. Examples are the Avogadro constant, the Diesel engine, meitnerium, Alzheimer's disease, and the Apgar score. For a different view of the process see Stigler's law of eponymy.
  - In biological nomenclature, organisms often receive scientific names that honor a person. Examples are the plant Linnaea (after Carl Linnaeus), the baobab Adansonia (after Michel Adanson), and the moth Caligula (after the Roman emperor Caligula). Common names can also honor people. Later, people may decide that they do not wish to memorialize a particular person, resulting in efforts to change a long-standing name. As debating each individual name is time-consuming, the American Ornithological Society announced in 2024 that they would establish new common names for all birds in North America that had previously been named after a person, without regard to whether modern culture would judge the person well or poorly.
  - Relatedly, biomedical terminology uses many eponymous terms, and many also have noneponymous synonyms.
  - Many astronomical objects are named after their discoverer or another person.
- In art:
  - Plays, books, and other forms of entertainment may have eponymous names, such as the ancient Greek epic The Odyssey, derived from its principal character, Odysseus, and the novel Robinson Crusoe.
  - The term is also used in the music industry, usually with regard to record titles, where it is prevalent and leads to confusion. For example, Bad Company's first album was entitled Bad Company and contained a popular song named "Bad Company". Parodying this, the band R.E.M. titled a 1988 compilation album Eponymous. One especially convoluted case of eponyms is the 1969 song "Black Sabbath", named after the 1963 movie Black Sabbath; the band that wrote the song changed their name to Black Sabbath and released it on the album Black Sabbath.
- In tribal antiquity, both in ancient Greece and independently among the Hebrews, tribes often took the name of a legendary leader (as Achaeus for Achaeans, or Dorus for Dorians). The eponym gave apparent meaning to the mysterious names of tribes, and sometimes, as in the Sons of Noah, provided a primitive attempt at ethnology as well, in the genealogical relationships of eponymous originators.

== Orthographic conventions ==
=== Capitalized versus lowercase ===
- Because proper nouns are capitalized in English, the usual default for eponyms is to capitalize the eponymous part of a term. When used as proper adjectives they are normally capitalized, for example Victorian, Shakespearean, and Kafkaesque.
- However, some eponymous words (adjectives, noun adjuncts, and nouns as substantives) are nowadays entered in many dictionaries as lowercase when they have evolved a common status, no longer deriving their meaning from the proper-noun origin. For example, Herculean when referring to Hercules himself, but often herculean when referring to the figurative, generalized extension sense; and quixotic, diesel [=diesel engine], and diesel [=diesel fuel] (lowercase-only in various dictionaries). For any given term, one dictionary may enter only lowercase or only cap, whereas other dictionaries may recognize the capitalized version as a variant, either equally common as, or less common than, the first-listed styling (marked with labels such as "or", "also", "often", or "sometimes"). The Chicago Manual of Style, in its section "Words derived from proper names", gives some examples of both lowercase and capitalized stylings, including a few terms styled both ways, and says, "Authors and editors must decide for themselves, but whatever choice is made should be followed consistently throughout a work."
- When the eponym is used together with a noun, the common-noun part is not capitalized (unless it is part of a title or it is the first word in a sentence). For example, in Parkinson disease (named after James Parkinson), Parkinson is capitalized, but disease is not. In addition, the adjectival form, where one exists, is usually lowercased for medical terms (thus parkinsonian although Parkinson disease), and gram-negative, gram-positive although Gram stain. Uppercase Gram-positive or Gram-negative however are also commonly used in scientific journal articles and publications. In other fields, the eponym derivative is commonly capitalized, for example, Newtonian in physics, and Platonic in philosophy (however, use lowercase platonic when describing love). The capitalization is retained after a prefix and hyphen, e.g. non-Newtonian.

For examples, see the comparison table below.

=== Genitive versus attributive ===
- English can use either genitive case or attributive position to indicate the adjectival nature of the eponymous part of the term. (In other words, that part may be either possessive or non-possessive.) Thus Parkinson's disease and Parkinson disease are both acceptable. Medical dictionaries have been shifting toward nonpossessive styling in recent decades. Thus Parkinson disease is more likely to be used in the latest medical literature (especially in postprints) than Parkinson's disease.

=== National varieties of English ===
- American and British English spelling differences may apply to eponyms. For example, British style would typically be caesarean section, which is also found in American medical publications, but cæsarean section (with a ligature) is sometimes seen in (mostly older) British writing, and cesarean is preferred by American dictionaries and some American medical works.

=== Comparison table of eponym orthographic styling ===
Prevalent dictionary styling today	Stylings that defy prevalent dictionary styling	Comments
abelian	*Abelian	
Addison disease	*Addison Disease *addison disease	
Allemann syndrome	*Allemann Syndrome *allemann syndrome	
cesarean [only] cesarean also cesarian [but no cap variant] cesarean, "often capitalized" or caesarean also cesarian or caesarian		More information on this word's orthographic variants is at Wiktionary: caesarean section.
darwinian [only] darwinism [only] Darwinian [only] Darwinism [only] Darwinist [only]		
diesel (n/adj/vi) [no cap variant] and also diesel-electric diesel engine dieseling dieselize, dieselization	*Diesel engine *Dieseling; *Dieselize, Dieselization	
draconian draconian often Draconian		
eustachian [only] eustachian often Eustachian eustachian tube [only] eustachian tube often Eustachian tube eustachian tube or Eustachian tube	*Eustachian Tube	
fallopian [only] fallopian often Fallopian fallopian tube [only] fallopian tube often Fallopian tube fallopian tube also Fallopian tube	*Fallopian Tube	
Marxism [only] Marxist [only]	*marxism *marxist	
mendelian [only] or Mendelian [only] mendelian inheritance [only] or Mendelian inheritance [only] but Mendel's laws	*Mendelian Inheritance	
Newtonian [only]	*newtonian	
parkinsonism [only] parkinsonian [only] parkinsonian tremor Parkinson disease [only] Parkinson's disease [only]	*Parkinsonism; *Parkinsonian; *Parkinsonian tremor *Parkinsonian Tremor; *Parkinson Disease; *Parkinson's Disease	
quixotic [only]	*Quixotic	
Roman numerals roman numerals		AMA Manual of Style lowercases the terms roman numerals and arabic numerals. MWCD enters the numeral sense under the headword Roman but with the note "not cap" on the numeral sense.

== Lists of eponyms ==
By person's name

- List of eponyms (A–K)
- List of eponyms (L–Z)

By category

- Adages
- Adjectives
- Asteroids
- Astronomical objects
- Cartoon characters
- Chemical elements
- Colleges and universities
- Companies
- Diseases
- Foods
- Human anatomical parts
- Ideologies
- Inventions
- Laws
- Mathematical theorems
- Medical signs
- Medical treatments
- Minerals
- Places and political entities
- Prizes, awards and medals
- Scientific constants
- Scientific equations
- Scientific laws
- Scientific phenomena
- Scientific units
- Sports terms
- Surgical procedures
- Tests
- Trademarks or brand names

== See also ==
- Antonomasia – Figure of speech
- Archetypal name – Proper name used as a descriptor
- Demonym – Name for a resident of a particular geographical area
- Eponymous hairstyles – Hairstyle associated with a particular individual
- Ethnonym – Identifier or designation referring to ethnicity
- Etymology – Study of the origin and evolution of words
  - Lists of etymologies
- False etymology – Popular, but false belief about word origins
- Genericized trademark – Trademark used for multiple brands
- List of eponymous laws – Adages and sayings named after a person
- Medical eponyms – Diseases named for people
- Metonym – Figure of speech
- Name reaction – Chemical reaction named after its discoverers or developers
- Pseudepigrapha – Falsely attributed works, texts falsely attributed to and named after someone who is not the author
- Stigler's law of eponymy – Observation that no scientific discovery is named after its discoverer
- Territorial designation – Geographical addendum to a British peerage title
- Toponymy – Study of place names
