= Arnaldo Cantani =

Italian physician and writer

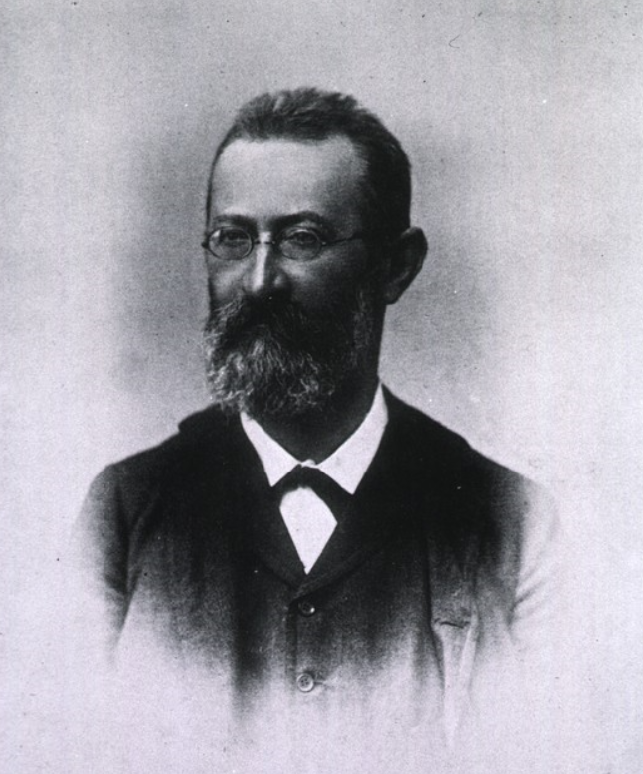
- Born: 15 February 1837; Hainsbach, North Bohemia
- Died: 1893 (aged 55–56); Naples, Italy
- Occupations: Physician, writer

Arnaldo Cantani, also known as Arnoldo Cantani (15 February 1837 – 1893), was an Italian physician and writer best known for his research on diabetes.

== Biography ==
Cantani was born in Hainsbach, North Bohemia. He entered to study medicine at the University of Prague in 1855 and obtained his M.D. in 1860. In 1864, the Italian Government offered Cantani the Chair of Materia Medica and Toxicology at the University of Pavia. In 1867, he won by competition the position of head physician at the Medical Clinic at the Ospedale Maggiore in Milan.

In 1868, he became Professor of Clinical Medicine at the University Of Naples, a position he held until his death. He was granted Italian citizenship in 1877 and two years later he was appointed Senator.

Cantani conducted medical research on cholera, diabetes, rabies and typhoid fever.

Cantani died from Bright's disease.

== Diabetes ==
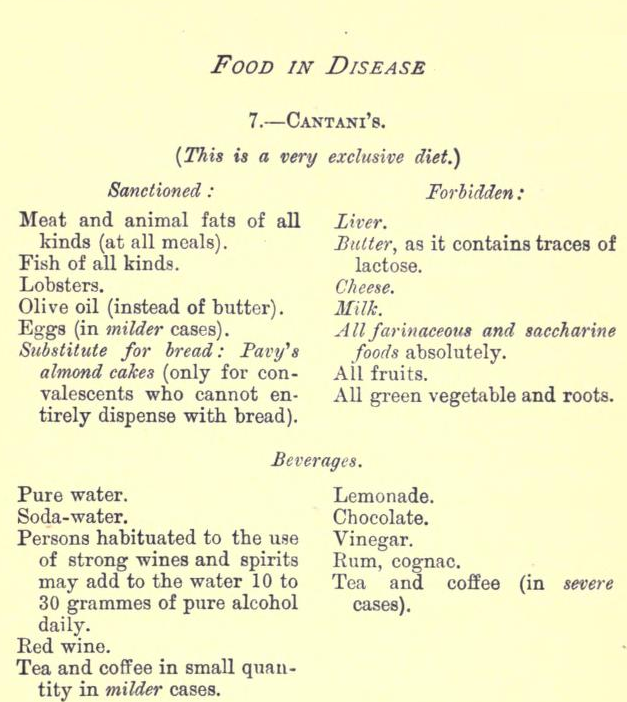
List of sanctioned and forbidden foods on the Cantani diet

Cantani treated his diabetic patients by eliminating carbohydrates and prescribing a meat diet. He believed that stopping glycosuria was the major method of controlling diabetes. This became known as Cantani's diet or the "Cantani system".

Cantani allowed his patients as many calories as they could tolerate without glycosuria. Later he limited daily food intake to about one pound of cooked meat. If glucosuria persisted, he fasted his patients. The exclusive meat diet would continue for several months but if urine was not free of sugar it would extend to six or nine months. To control glycosuria, Cantani would enforce his diet restrictions. He would often lock his patients in a room, so they adhered to the strict diet. He performed microscopic studies on the organs from thousands of cases and observed that atrophy and fatty changes were more frequently found in the pancreas of diabetic patients than of non-diabetics.

Cantani's exclusive animal food diet consisted of all kinds of meat and animal fats, fish, lobsters and eggs but no dairy as it contains lactose. A list of sanctioned and forbidden foods on Cantani's diet was included in Isaac Burney Yeo's book Food in Health and Disease, published in 1896. Bernhard Naunyn was influenced by the Cantani system.

Cantani also favoured the use of lactic acid to treat diabetes. He administered his patients 77–154 grains of lactic acid daily which was diluted in 8–10 fluid ounces of water. This became known as Cantani's method and influenced George William Balfour.

== Selected publications ==
- Patologia e Terapia del Ricambio Materiale (1875)
- Le diabète sucré et son traitement diététique (1876)

birth register in Lipová (former Hainsbach) in North Bohemia
