= Abdominoperineal resection =

Surgery for rectal or anal cancer

- Other names: abdominoperineal excision, or Miles operation
- Specialty: General surgery

Scar after removal of the anus in abdominoperineal resection surgery. The sacral dimple above is congenital and not a result of surgery

An abdominoperineal resection (abbreviated as AP resection, APR, or APER), formally known as an abdominoperineal resection of the rectum or an abdominoperineal excision of the rectum, is a surgical procedure performed to treat rectal cancer or anal cancer.

This operation involves the removal of the distal colon, rectum, and anus, resulting in the creation of a permanent colostomy. It is typically indicated for tumors located in the lower rectum or anal canal that cannot be adequately removed while preserving sphincter function. The procedure is performed via both an abdominal and a perineal approach, requiring the excision of affected tissues along with adjacent lymph nodes to ensure complete tumor removal and reduce the risk of recurrence.

== Indication and description ==
See image on National Cancer Institute website The principal indication for AP resection is a rectal carcinoma situated in the distal (lower) one-third of the rectum. Other indications include recurrent or residual anal carcinoma (squamous cell carcinoma) following initial, usually definitive combination chemoradiotherapy.

APRs involves removal of the anus, the rectum and part of the sigmoid colon along with the associated (regional) lymph nodes, through incisions made in the abdomen and perineum. The end of the remaining sigmoid colon is brought out permanently as an opening, called a stoma, which is used by the patient in conjunction with a colostomy pouch, on the surface of the abdomen.

The perineal part of the operation may be performed with intersphincteric dissection, leaving the external sphincter and levator muscles in-situ. This results in a smaller defect in the perineum and may be preferable when a margin to healthy tissue is not an issue, e.g. in IBD surgery.

== Centralisation of rectal surgery ==
This operation is one of the less commonly performed by general surgeons, although they are specifically trained to perform this operation. As low case volumes in rectal surgery have been found to be associated with higher complication rates, it is often centralised in larger centres, where case volumes are higher.

== Laparoscopic approach ==
There are several advantages in terms of outcomes if the surgery can be performed laparoscopically

== Relation to low anterior resection (LAR) ==
An APR, generally, results in a worse quality of life than the less invasive lower anterior resection (LAR). Thus, LARs are generally the preferred treatment for rectal cancer insofar as this is surgically feasible.

== History ==
William Ernest Miles (1869–1947), an English surgeon first performed the surgery of removing the rectum in 1907. He assumed that the rectal cancer can spread in both upwards and downward directions, thus necessitating the removal of the entire rectum together with the anal sphincters, resulting in a permanent stoma by connecting the proximal end of the descending colon to the skin. Mile's operation became the gold standard for treating rectal cancer because his technique successfully reduced the rate of cancer recurrence.

To reduce the incidence of death and suffering of the patients associated with the APR procedure, Henri Albert Hartmann introduced the anterior resection of the rectum by preserving the distal rectum and anal sphincters, while producing end-sigmoid colostomy. There were attempts to restore bowel continuity by joining the proximal colon with the rectum, but the high incidence of leakage from the anastomotic site caused an increased risk of death to patients. It was only in 1948, Claude Dixon successfully connected the proximal bowel to the rectum, thus allowing patients to have a 64% 5-year survival rate.

== See also ==
- Stoma (medicine)
- Total mesorectal excision
