= Human bake oven =

Medical contraption

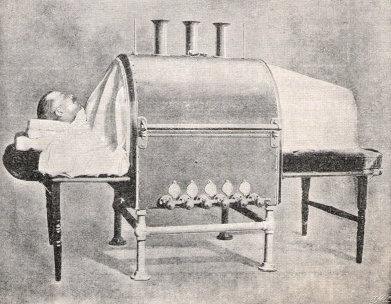
A patient being baked

The human bake oven, also known as the Tallerman–Sheffield treatment, Tallerman treatment or Tallerman's apparatus, was a Victorian era medical contraption used to treat various ailments, primarily joint problems such as rheumatism. Based on the knowledge that heat is often useful in alleviating pain, patients would be placed in the iron lung-like machine and then baked at temperatures typically around 138°C (280°F) but sometimes as high as 204°C (400°F). The sensation was variously described as either quite pleasant or feeling like one was being roasted alive.

== History ==
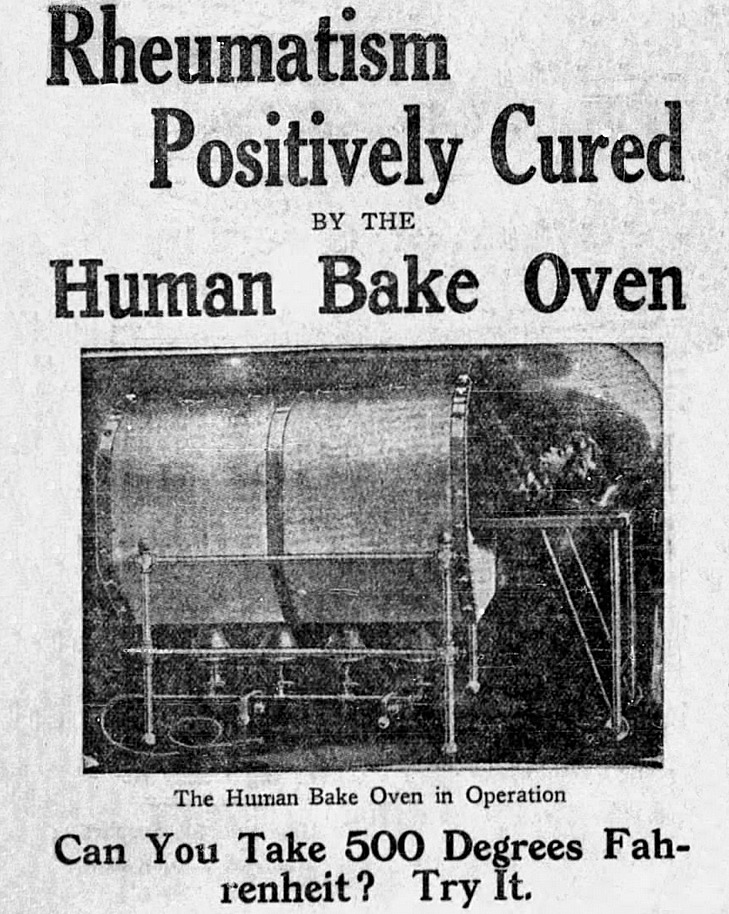
1912 advertisement in the Calgary Herald

The idea for the human bake oven came from the knowledge that heat was useful in alleviating pain, something that had been known since antiquity and had previously been employed in medicine through treatments such as mustard plasters. The human bake oven was the result of work carried out by the engineers Thomas Henry Rees, Evelyn Sheffield and Lewis A. Tallerman in the late 1890s. The idea for the bake oven was thought out independently by both Rees and Sheffield, who pondered how hot dry air could be used for medical treatment. The two together took a patent for "An Improved Medical Dry Bath for Applying Superheated Steam or Gases and Medicines in Vapour for the Human Body" in 1893. Shortly thereafter, Tallerman joined the project as well. The human bake oven was envisioned as being used to heal not only rheumatism but also gout, inflammation and "all forms of pain".

Sheffield and Tallerman took another similar patent together in Victoria, Australia in 1894; the earliest human bake ovens were as a result of the patent formally known as the "Tallerman–Sheffield Hot-Air Treatment of Disease". The bake oven was successfully tested at St Bartholomew's Hospital in London in 1894. It was reported on 12 January 1895 that the human bake oven also successfully passed a trial at the North-West London Hospital without "a single failure", succeeding in treating cases of rheumatism, sprains, gout, a chronic leg ulcer and a tuberculous knee-joint. The bake oven soon began being used in hospitals in the city as well as internationally at hospitals in cities such as Paris, Berlin, Baden-Baden and Philadelphia. It garnered international scholarly interest, being publicized in the medical journal The Lancet. The engineers ensured that the treatment would be available for free for the poor. Institutes devoted specifically to the treatment, with free entry, were set up in poor areas in Lowestoft and Stockholm.

By 1900, three bake ovens were in operation in the United States, located in hospitals in New York, Philadelphia and Chicago. A pamphlet published by W. B. Northrop in September that year, titled The Baking Cure, praised the machine as "the latest thing in American medical science" (misattributing its invention to a Mr. Sprague of Rochester, New York). In the same year, the three partners behind the bake oven had begun feuding over various legal disputes. Rees and Tallerman were experienced businessmen whereas Sheffield was not and they appear to have driven her away from the project and together set up the company Tallerman Institutes. Tallerman worked tirelessly to expunge Sheffield's name from the treatment and from financial association with the company; the treatment began to be called the "Tallerman treatment" rather than the "Tallerman–Sheffield treatment" and Tallerman began to threaten legal action against anyone attempting to create machines similar to his own.

Use of the human bake oven fell out of popularity by the late 1930s to 1940s. The human bake oven, under the name Tallerman's apparatus, still appeared in the Dorland's Illustrated Medical Dictionary as late as 1965.

== Treatments ==
While the Human Bake oven was mainly aimed to treat joint issues, the manufacturer claimed numerous other health benefits. The oven was claimed to help with gastrointestinal issues such as constipation and irritable bowel syndrome. It also allegedly helped with dermal issues such as skin disease, open sores, and ulcers. It was also used to treat heart issues such as heart arrhythmia and heart failure. The oven was also used in the treatment of kidney issues, bladder issues, irregular blood pressure, malnutrition, diabetes, and obesity, flat feet, hay fever, Bright's disease, edema, tonsillitis, gangrene, and pre-eclampsia in pregnant woman. The oven was also used in the treatment of lung related issues such as asthma and tuberculosis. Sanatoriums sometimes had in hospital human bake ovens to help with the treatment of TB patients, particularly those suffering with joint stiffness.

== Application and use ==
The human bake oven resembled an iron lung in appearance, consisting of a large metal cylinder and wooden extensions at both sides for the head and feet, respectively. The metal was heated through the use of Bunsen burners. The patient's body was protected from being burned by the metal through the use of cork ribs inside the cylinder. The temperature used in the machine was on average 138°C (280°F) but sometimes temperatures as high as 204°C (400°F) could be employed. Though the maximum temperature tolerable for any lengthy period of time is 112°C (237°F), the hospital test in 1894 supposedly demonstrated that temperatures of up to 148°C (298°F) could be used in the bake oven without patients experiencing any "inconvenience".

Some patients reportedly began feeling that they were being roasted alive and experienced their hearts thumping rapidly while undergoing treatment in bake ovens. Northrop's 1900 pamphlet described the sensation as follows:

When the heat is first turned on the patient experiences no sensations other than mild warmth. … Up to about 150deg. Fahr. [66°C] little inconvenience is felt. Then the patient becomes thirsty. … When 180deg. [82°C] have been registered … the patient feels thousands of tiny streams of heat impinging against his body … the lower extremities now become somewhat numb … At 200deg. [93°C] one experiences a dreamy sensation, and from this point up to 280deg. [138°C] the baking experience is really quite pleasant.

== See also ==
- List of eponymous medical treatments
