= Dallas B. Phemister =

American surgeon (1882–1951)

- Dallas B. Phemister in a University of Chicago photograph
- Born: Dallas Burton Phemister; July 15, 1882; Carbondale, Illinois, US
- Died: December 28, 1951 (aged 69); Billings Hospital, Chicago, Illinois, US
- Monuments: Dallas B. Phemister Hall, University of Chicago (demolished in 2000)
- Education: Rush Medical College (MD)
- Occupations: Surgeon, researcher
- Employer: University of Chicago
- Organization(s): American Surgical Association; American College of Surgeons; Annals of Surgery; Orthopaedic Research Society

Dallas Burton Phemister (/ˈfɛmɪstər/; July 15, 1882 – December 28, 1951) was an American surgeon and researcher who gave his name to several medical terms. During his career, he was the president of the American Surgical Association and the American College of Surgeons, and was a member of the editorial board of the journal Annals of Surgery.

== Career ==
Phemister attained his MD from Rush Medical College in 1904, before conducting post-graduate study in Europe.

From its inception in 1920, he was involved with the Codman Registry of Bone Sarcoma, the oldest tumor registry in the United States. After its founder, Ernest Amory Codman, he was its second chair.

He was the first full-time professor and chairman of the Department of Surgery at the University of Chicago, which he led from 1925 to 1947. Early in his tenure there, he appointed Lester Dragstedt as an associate professor of surgery. In 1927, he invited Charles Brenton Huggins to join the University of Chicago faculty, specializing in urology. He also served as a mentor for orthopedic surgeon Lent C. Johnson. In 1938, William Adams and Phemister carried out a pioneering esophageal resection surgery. That same year, he was elected as the president of the American Surgical Association.

In the 1950s, several musculoskeletal investigators expressed a desire to have a forum for presenting their work and receiving constructive criticism. This idea gained unanimous support from the American Academy of Orthopaedic Surgeons at their Annual Meeting in 1951. Phemister agreed to take on the role of chairman of the new organization, named the Orthopaedic Research Society, but died unexpectedly at the age of 69 before he could take up the position. He died at the Billings Hospital in Chicago of appendicitis.

== Eponyms ==
Phemister's name has been given to several medical techniques and signs. Most prominent among these is the Phemister graft, a technique for transplanting bone in cases of bone fractures with delayed union. The Phemister triad refers to three features typically seen in tuberculous arthritis: "juxta-articular osteopenia or osteoporosis, peripheral osseous erosions, and gradual narrowing of joint spaces... present in any large joint including the knee, hip, and shoulder."

Dallas B. Phemister Hall, a student residence building at the University of Chicago built in 1958, was named for him. It was demolished in 2000 to make room for the Interdivisional Research Building.
