= Lists of medical eponyms =

Diseases named for people

Medical eponyms are diseases, disorders, or syndromes named after people, and occasionally places or things. Eponyms are widely used and new ones continue to be coined, although some physicians argue against their use.

Eponyms are most typically named after the physician or researcher who first described the condition, such as Parkinson's disease, after James Parkinson (1755-1824) or Alzheimer's disease, after Alois Alzheimer (1864–1915). Some diseases are commonly known by a famous patient's name, such as Lou Gehrig disease, although amyotrophic lateral sclerosis is the clinical name. A few clinical names come from a patient's name, such as Hartnup disease (formally pellagra-like dermatosis with transitory cerebellar ataxia), named for a family with this hereditary disease. Sometimes conditions are named after multiple physicians or scientists, such as Waterhouse–Friderichsen syndrome. Lyme disease is named for two towns where the symptoms were first identified. The eponym may even be a fictional character with no direct relationship to the disease. For example, Munchausen syndrome was coined because, like Baron von Munchausen, "the persons affected have always travelled widely, and their stories, like those attributed to him, are both dramatic and untrue."

Eponyms are widely used in medicine and continue to be coined. There are no rules around the coining of eponyms:

...the physician scientist whose name becomes the eponym is often distinguishable from other parallel observers for reasons other than being first. It may be the individual's reputation, standing, accuracy, details contained in the report or publication, or a fortuitous rediscovery often decades later by someone who then associates the disease with one or more of the earlier physician scientists. Sometimes luck plays a major role. There are no rules on eponym development. It may take an extraordinary period of time, be different in different languages and cultures, and evolve as more is known about the physician or the disease.

Whether medicine should use eponyms is debated. Arguments in favor include honoring the discoverers; bringing color to medicine; and providing a convenient shorthand. The names may be easier to remember than by their pathological description: compare Hodgkin lymphoma and nodular sclerosing, mixed cellularity, lymphocyte depleted, lymphocyte rich, and nodular lymphocyte-predominant lymphomas. Eponyms have replaced some older disease names which were problematic in various ways: "Mongolism" is racist, while Down syndrome is neutral; leprosy has centuries of stigmatizing connotations, while Hansen's disease does not, so was promoted as a more human name.

Eponyms also have disadvantages. Using an eponym also often oversimplifies the history, which may have involved multiple clinicians and researchers. Some eponyms vary from country to country. And some names are used for multiple diseases: there are twelve named for Harvey Cushing. Some are named after persons with negative associations.

Arguments for replacing eponyms by biologically-descriptive names include better communication with patients and medical trainees and better understanding by medical students. One medical conference in 1975 concluded that "The possessive use of an eponym should be discontinued, since the author neither had nor owned the disorder."

Some eponyms have been replaced. For example, Reiter's syndrome, named after a Nazi medical war criminal, is now called reactive arthritis.

All agree that eponyms are widely used and unlikely to change quickly. Indeed, new discoveries continue to be named for their discoverers.

- List of eponymous diseases
- List of eponymous fractures
- List of eponymous medical devices
- List of eponymous medical signs
- List of eponymous medical treatments
- List of eponymous surgical procedures
- List of eponymous tests
- List of human anatomical parts named after people
- List of medical eponyms with Nazi associations
- List of orthopaedic eponyms
- List of eponyms in neuroscience, neurology and neurosurgery
