= List of eponymous medical treatments =

Eponymous medical treatments are generally named after the physician or surgeon who described the treatment.

Treatment	Name	Specialty	Description	Reference/External link
Brandt–Daroff manoeuvre	Thomas Brandt, Robert B. Daroff	Otolaryngology	Exercises used to treat benign paroxysmal positional vertigo	Brandt–Daroff manoeuvre at Whonamedit?
Carrel–Dakin treatment	Alexis Carrel, Henry Drysdale Dakin	General surgery	Irrigation of wounds with the antiseptic Dakin's solution (no longer used)	Carrel–Dakin treatment at Whonamedit?
Epley's manoeuvre	John Epley	Otolaryngology	Manoeuvre used to treat benign paroxysmal positional vertigo	Epley JM (September 1992). "The canalith repositioning procedure: for treatment of benign paroxysmal positional vertigo". Otolaryngol Head Neck Surg. 107 (3): 399–404. doi:10.1177/019459989210700310. PMID 1408225.
Heimlich manoeuvre	Henry Heimlich	Emergency medicine	Abdominal thrust used to clear airway obstruction by foreign body	Heimlich's manoeuvre at Whonamedit?
Kocher's method	Emil Theodor Kocher	Orthopaedics	Method used to reduce dislocated shoulders	Kocher's method III at Whonamedit?
Mitchell's rest cure	Silas Weir Mitchell	Psychiatry	Treatment involving bed rest for anxiety disorders	Mitchell's rest cure at Whonamedit?
Ochsner–Sherren treatment	Albert John Ochsner, James Sherren	General surgery	Conservative (i.e. non-operative) management of appendicitis (no longer used)	Ochsner–Sherren treatment at Whonamedit?
Pasteur's treatment	Louis Pasteur	Virology	Daily inoculations of suspensions of partially inactivated rabies, used to treat or prevent rabies (no longer used)	Pasteur's treatment at Whonamedit?
Plummer treatment	Henry Stanley Plummer	Endocrinology	Use of iodine for the treatment of hyperthyroidism	Plummer treatment at Whonamedit?
Semont manoeuvre	A Semont	Otolaryngology	Manoeuvre used to treat benign paroxysmal positional vertigo	Semont A, Freyss G, Vitte E (1988). "Curing the BPPV with a liberatory maneuver". Adv. Otorhinolaryngol. 42: 290–3. PMID 3213745.
Sippy diet	Bertram Sippy	Gastroenterology	Diet of milk and antacid powders to treat gastric ulcer (no longer used)	Sippy diet at Whonamedit?
Stroganoff' method	Vasilii Vasilovich Stroganoff	Obstetrics	Treatment of eclampsia with morphine, chloral hydrate, quiet and rapid delivery (obsolete term)	Stroganoff's method at Whonamedit?
Tallerman–Sheffield treatment	Lewis A. Tallerman and Evelyn Sheffield	Rheumatism, pain	Treatment of pain through baking patients alive	
Wagner–Jauregg treatment	Julius Wagner Jauregg	Infectious diseases	Treatment of general paresis of the insane by infecting the patient with malaria	Wagner–Jauregg therapy at Whonamedit?
Williams Flexion Exercises	Paul C. Williams	Orthopedics	Treatment of low back pain by enhancing lumbar flexion	Williams P.C. (1937), “Lesions of the Lumbosacral Spine: 2. Chronic Traumatic (postural) Destruction of the Lumbosacral Intervertebral Disc”, J Bone Joint Surgery; 29:690–703
Yeo's treatment	Isaac Burney Yeo	Bariatrics	Treatment of obesity using hot drinks and carbohydrate avoidance	Yeo's treatment at Whonamedit?
Yuzpe regimen	A. Albert Yuzpe	Gynecology	Two sequential high female hormone doses as emergency contraception	
