= Williams Flexion Exercises =

Set or system of related physical exercises

Williams flexion exercises
- Other names: Williams exercises
- Specialty: Orthopedic

Williams flexion exercises (WFE) – also called Williams lumbar flexion exercises – are a set of related physical exercises intended to enhance lumbar flexion, avoid lumbar extension, and strengthen the abdominal and gluteal musculature in an effort to manage low back pain non-surgically. The system was first devised in 1937 by Dallas orthopedic surgeon Dr. Paul C. Williams.

WFEs have been a cornerstone in the management of lower back pain for many years for treating a wide variety of back problems, regardless of diagnosis or chief complaint. In many cases they are used when the disorder's cause or characteristics were not fully understood by the physician, athletic trainer or physical therapist. Also, physical therapists and athletic trainers often teach these exercises with their own modifications.

== History ==
The WFEs were developed out of the Regen exercise (also called "squat exercise"), advocated in the 1930s by Eugene M. Regen, a Tennessee orthopedic surgeon, and which consist in squatting and emphasizing the convexity of the lumbar area. (The Regen exercise was originally publicized in a film by the Veterans Administration.) Williams first published his own modified exercise program in 1937 for patients with chronic low back pain in response to his clinical observation that the majority of patients who experienced low back pain had degenerative vertebrae secondary to degenerative disk disease. These exercises were initially developed for men under 50 and women under 40 who had exaggerated lumbar lordosis, whose x-ray films showed decreased disc space between lumbar spine segments (L1-S1), and whose symptoms were chronic, but low grade.

== Theory ==
Williams suggested that humans, in evolving to stand erect, severely deformed the vertebral column, redistributing body weight to the posterior aspect of the intervertebral discs in the lumbar spine. At the 4th and 5th lumbar levels, great pressure is said to be exerted on the posterior aspect of each vertebra and transferred from the vertebra to the disc. Williams specified that in most cases the 5th lumbar disc ruptures and the nuclear material of the disc moves into the spinal canal causing pressure on the spinal nerves. In addition to the ruptured disc, irritation of the nerve at the intervertebral foramen where the nerve exits from the spinal canal may result. He believed that this rarely occurs except at the 5th lumbar level, and that the likelihood of the nerves being impinged was greatly increased by extending the lumbar spine. Williams emphasized the universality of this problem: "The fifth lumbar disc has ruptured in the majority of all persons by the age of twenty...." He suggested that although most people at this age have not experienced severe low back pain, they will, in all likelihood be subject to mild bouts of low back pain which can be attributed to the ruptured disc. The solution, Williams argued, was to have the patient perform exercises and adhere to postural principles which serve to decrease the lumbar lordosis to a minimum, thereby reducing the pressure on the posterior elements of the lumbar spine.

== Procedures and mechanisms ==
The WFEs were for many years the standard for non-surgical low back pain treatment.

These exercises were performed in the supine position on a floor or other flat surface. There were variations, but the primary maneuver is to grab the legs and pull the knees up to the chest and hold them there for several seconds. The patient then relaxes, drops the legs down and repeats the exercise again.

The primary benefit is supposed to be the opening of the intervertebral foramen, the stretching of ligamentous structures, and the distraction of the apophyseal joints.

The goals of performing these exercises were to reduce pain and provide lower trunk stability by actively developing the "abdominal, gluteus maximus, and hamstring muscles as well as..." passively stretching the hip flexors and lower back (sacrospinalis) muscles. Williams said: "The exercises outlined will accomplish a proper balance between the flexor and the extensor groups of postural muscles...". Williams suggested that a posterior pelvic-tilt position was necessary to obtain best results.

Both flexion and extension exercises have been shown to help mitigate back pain and has been demonstrated to accomplish the following: a) significantly increase the canal area, b) increase the midsagittal diameter, c) increase the subarticular sagittal diameter, and d) increase all the foraminal dimensions significantly

== McKenzie extension exercises ==
The WFEs stand in some opposition to another type of back exercises, devised by Robin McKenzie and known as the "McKenzie extension exercises", which involve the opposite motion of extending the spine backwards. One review stated that "Perhaps no two methods of physical therapy treatment for low back pain are so contradictory in both theory and practice." In contrast to Williams, McKenzie suggested that all spinal pain can be attributed to alteration of the position of the disc's nucleus pulposus, in relationship to the surrounding annulus; mechanical deformation of the soft tissue about the spine which has undergone adaptive shortening; or mechanical deformation of soft tissue caused by postural stress. McKenzie concluded that a continually flexed lifestyle may cause the nucleus to migrate more posteriorly, resulting in low back pain. Moreover, these anomalies of the lumbar spine are largely due to our modern lifestyle and "an almost universal loss of extension". As treatment, McKenzie recommended exercises and postural instructions which restore or maintain the lumbar lordosis. Although exercises involving lumbar spine extension are emphasized in this treatment protocol, particularly in the early stages, lumbar flexion exercises are usually added at a later time in order that the patient has full range of spinal flexion and extension. The McKenzie protocol also now includes flexion protocols and stresses the importance of differentiating whether flexion or extension improves patient's symptoms. As a result, McKenzie principles are used by many physical therapists in the treatment of low back pain, whereas Williams Exercises are no longer taught as a physical therapy protocol. This is supported by evidence which demonstrates improved functional outcomes for the McKenzie approach in comparison to the Williams exercises.

== See also ==
- List of eponymous medical treatments
