= Eliza Doolittle =

Fictional character in Pygmalion and My Fair Lady

- Pygmalion character
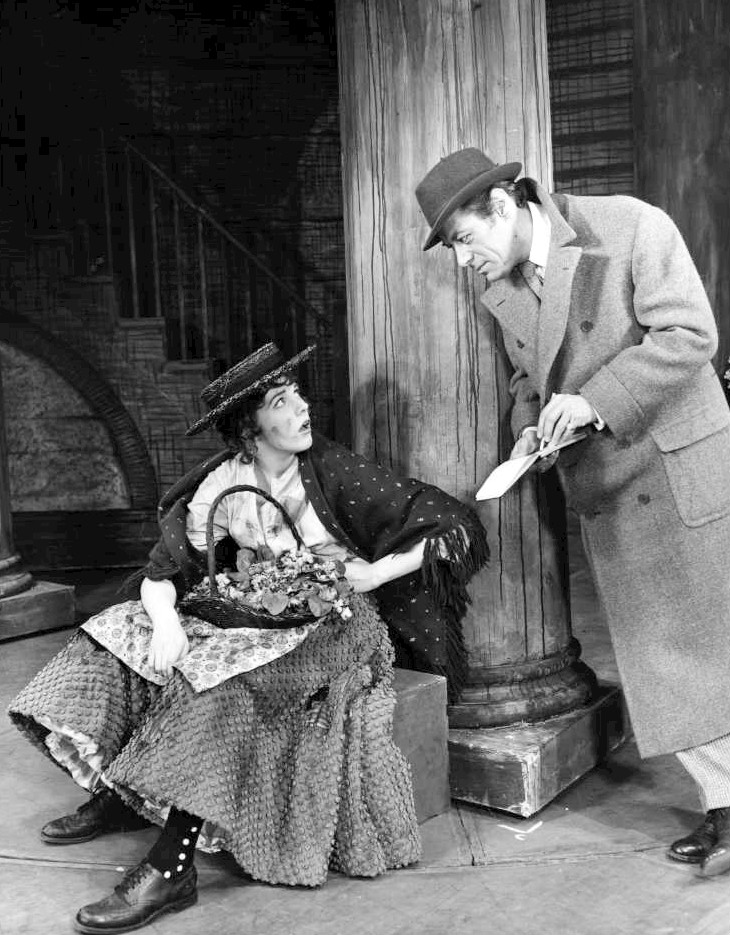
- Julie Andrews as Eliza Doolittle meets Rex Harrison as Henry Higgins in the 1956 stage musical, My Fair Lady
- First appearance: Pygmalion (1913)
- Created by: George Bernard Shaw
- Portrayed by: Mrs Patrick Campbell; Wendy Hiller; Julie Andrews (stage); Audrey Hepburn (film)

In-universe information
- Alias: Liza
- Nickname: "The Flower Girl" (Act I)
- Gender: Female
- Occupation: Flower girl
- Family: Alfred P. Doolittle (father)
- Spouse: Freddy Eynsford-Hill
- Nationality: English

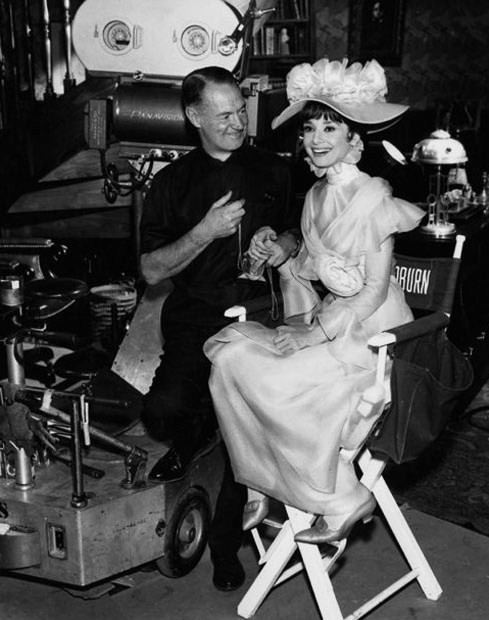
Audrey Hepburn as Eliza Doolittle on the set of 1964 film adaptation.

Eliza Doolittle is a fictional character and the protagonist in George Bernard Shaw's play Pygmalion (1913) and its 1956 musical adaptation, My Fair Lady.

Eliza (from Lisson Grove, London) is a Cockney flowerseller who comes to Professor Henry Higgins, asking for elocution lessons after a chance encounter at Covent Garden. Higgins goes along with it for the purposes of a wager: that he can turn her into the toast of elite London society. Her Cockney dialect includes words that are common among working class Londoners, such as ain't: "I ain't done nothing wrong by speaking to the gentleman".

Doolittle receives voice coaching and learns the rules of etiquette. The outcome of these attentions varies between the original play and its various adaptations (see Pygmalion).

== History ==
The character of Eliza Doolittle was likely inspired by the real story of Eliza Sheffield (1856–1942), a barmaid in London who rose through the ranks of society in the late 19th century through marriage, various relationships, and forgeries.

The part of Eliza was originally played by Mrs Patrick Campbell, at that time the most famous actress on London's West End stage. Shaw had written the role for her, and although many considered her too old for the role, she triumphed. The unprecedented use of the word "bloody" – as a scripted intensive – caused a sensation when Campbell delivered it.

For the 1938 film Pygmalion, George Bernard Shaw personally requested that the young English actress Wendy Hiller play Doolittle, a part she had previously played on stage opposite Leslie Howard as Higgins. Her performance was the definitive film portrayal until Audrey Hepburn played the role in the highly successful 1964 film musical My Fair Lady.

Julie Andrews originated the musical version of Doolittle on stage in My Fair Lady, with Rex Harrison as Higgins. Sally Ann Howes took the role of Eliza Doolittle in 1958 when Julie Andrews left. Harrison went on to reprise his role in the 1964 film alongside Audrey Hepburn as Doolittle. At the 37th Academy Awards, the award for Best Actress went to Andrews for her performance as Mary Poppins. Hepburn was not nominated. Despite this, many critics greatly applauded Hepburn's "exquisite" performance. "The happiest thing about [My Fair Lady]", wrote Bosley Crowther, "is that Audrey Hepburn superbly justifies the decision of Jack Warner to get her to play the title role." Her co-star Rex Harrison also called Hepburn his favourite leading lady, and Gene Ringgold of Soundstage also commented that "Audrey Hepburn is magnificent. She is Eliza for the ages," while adding, "Everyone agreed that if Julie Andrews was not to be in the film, Audrey Hepburn was the perfect choice."

Martine McCutcheon played the role in the 2001 London revival of My Fair Lady. She missed many performances (citing health problems), with various understudies performing the role, and withdrew nearly five months early from the production's transfer to the Theatre Royal, Drury Lane, but nevertheless she won the award for best actress in a musical at the 2002 Laurence Olivier Awards. One of the understudies was the then unknown Kerry Ellis.

Lauren Ambrose played the role in the 2018 Lincoln Center Theater revival of My Fair Lady on Broadway, a performance for which she was nominated for the 2018 Tony Award for Best Actress in a Musical and won the 2018 Outer Critics Circle Award for Outstanding Actress in a Musical. Kirsten Anderson has been Ambrose's alternate, performing the role once a week. Laura Benanti replaced Ambrose in October 2018 to perform the role through July 2019.

== Eliza Doolittle Day ==
A song from My Fair Lady, titled "Just You Wait", sung by Eliza, includes this passage:

One day I'll be famous! I'll be proper and prim;
Go to St. James so often I will call it St. Jim!
One evening the king will say:
"Oh, Liza, old thing,
I want all of England your praises to sing.
Next week on the twentieth of May
I proclaim 'Liza Doolittle Day!"

Fans of My Fair Lady have, ever after, been fond of making an informal observance of Eliza Doolittle Day each May 20.

== See also ==
- ELIZA, an artificial intelligence program named after the character
