= Hinchey Classification =

Medical diagnostic scale

Hinchey Classification is used to describe perforations of the colon due to diverticulitis. The classification was developed by Dr. E John Hinchey (1934–present), a general surgeon at the Montreal General Hospital and professor of surgery at McGill University.

Diverticulosis (the presence of bowel diverticula) is an essentially ubiquitous phenomenon. With age, all people develop out-pouching of the bowel wall as pressure from the inside of the bowel pushes the mucosa outwards. The pouches (diverticula) occur where there is a gap between or weakness within the muscle fibres of the bowel wall, classically at sites of vessel protrusion into the wall. Although the majority of diverticula are asymptomatic, the most commonly noticed symptom of diverticula is bloody stool. When diverticula (singular: diverticulum) become sites of inflammation the condition is termed "diverticulitis" and occurs when the diveritcula become infected. This classically causes lower abdominal pain, changes in bowel habits (diarrhea or constipation) and signs of inflammation (fever/chills, nausea/vomiting). Unlike diverticulosis (the condition of having out-pouchings), diverticulitis is not typically associated with active bleeding.

There are several complications that can arise from diverticulitis, and one of the more serious complications of this is perforation of the bowel. "Perforation" in this sense refers to rupture of the diverticulum, resulting in air leaking into the abdominal cavity. If the perforation is very small, it may be contained (often referred to by surgeons as a localized perforation). However, if it is not contained it leads to faecal contamination of the peritoneal cavity (faecal peritonitis) which is often fatal.

The Hinchey classification – proposed by Hinchey et al. in 1978 classifies a colonic perforation due to diverticular disease. The classification is I–IV:

- Hinchey I – localised abscess (para-colonic)
- Hinchey II – pelvic abscess
- Hinchey III – purulent peritonitis (the presence of pus in the abdominal cavity)
- Hinchey IV – feculent peritonitis. (Intestinal perforation allowing feces into abdominal cavity).

The Hinchey classification is useful as it guides surgeons as to how conservative they can be in emergency surgery. Recent studies have shown with anything up to a Hinchey III, a laparoscopic wash-out is a safe procedure, avoiding the need for a laparotomy and stoma formation.
