= Isaac Burney Yeo =

English physician and writer

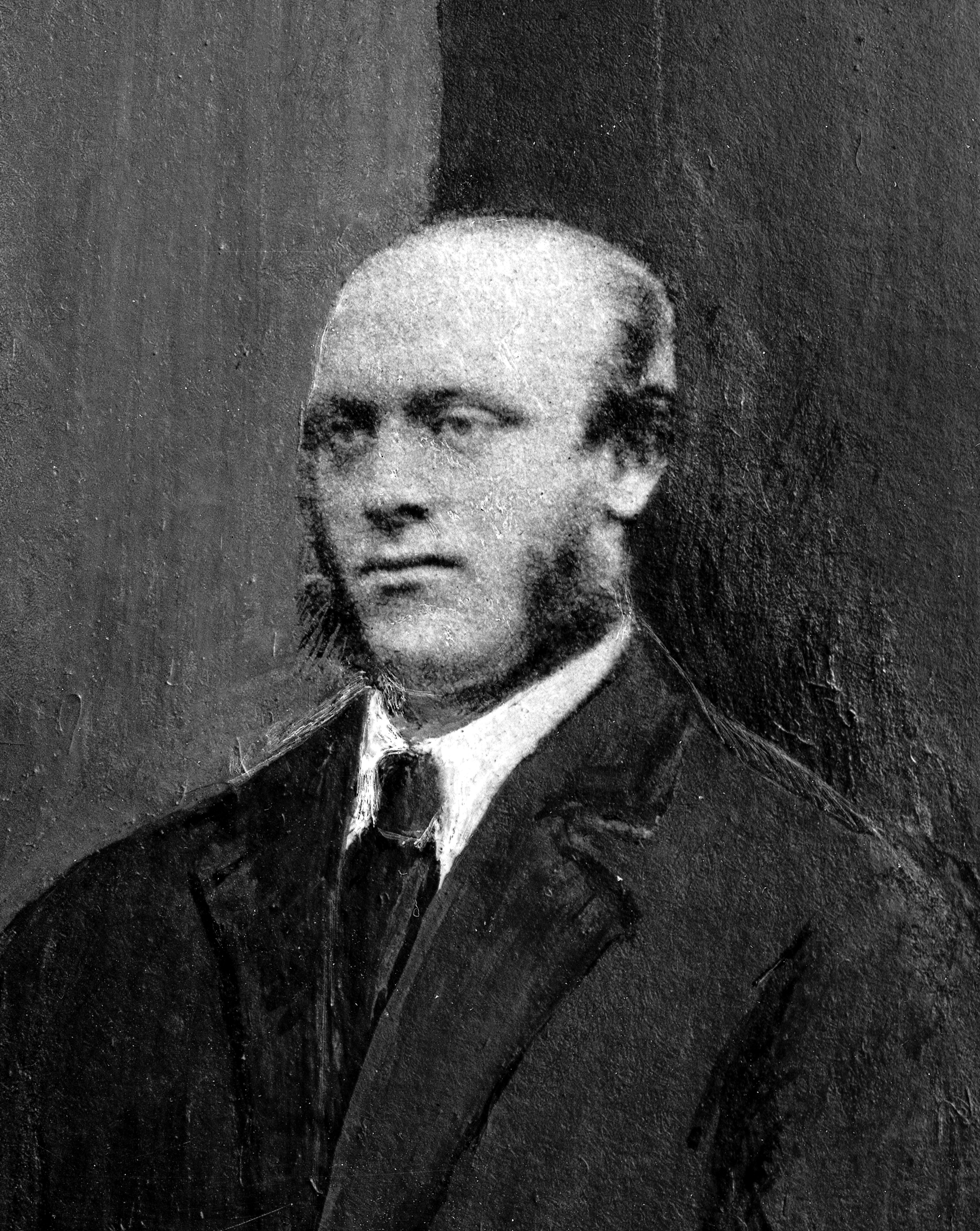
- Born: 3 March 1835; Stonehouse, Devon, England
- Died: 20 November 1914 (aged 79); Weybridge, England
- Occupation(s): Physician, writer

Isaac Burney Yeo (3 March 1835 – 20 November 1914) was an English physician and writer.

== Biography ==
Yeo was born at Stonehouse, Devon. For some years, he worked as an apprentice to a local practitioner, Dr. James Sheppard. He studied medicine at King's College London from 1858. He joined the Medical Department of King's College, gained the senior Medical Scholarship and qualified M.D from London University. In 1865, he was appointed medical tutor at King's College a position he held until 1871. From 1869 he worked as assistant physician and was later made consulting physician to King's College Hospital and Brompton Hospital for Diseases of the Chest. At King's College he held successively the chairs of Clinal Therapeutics and of the Principles and Practice of Medicine and on his retirement in 1899 was appointed Emeritus Professor of Medicine.

In the 1890s, Yeo developed a wire mesh oro-nasal inhaler. Yeo contributed to medical literature and his books were widely read. His Manuel of Medical Treatment, first published in 1893 had sold over 30,000 copies by 1914. His book Food in Health and Disease was positively reviewed in medical journals. A review in the British Medical Journal noted that "Yeo is fully master of his subject, and he supplies in a compact form nearly all that the practitioner requires to know on the subject of diet." The book contains a chapter criticizing strict vegetarianism.

Yeo specialized in bariatrics. He proposed a treatment of obesity using hot drinks and avoiding carbohydrates. Yeo may have been the first physician to use raw meat to treat diabetic patients. In 1873, he gave it to two patients, without notable results.

He married Winifred Helen Spyers of Weybridge late in life and they had no children. Yeo is buried at Weybridge Cemetery.

== Selected publications ==
- Climate and Health Resorts (1885)
- Food in Health and Disease (1890, 1896)
- Manuel of Medical Treatment (two volumes, 1893)
- Raw Meat in Diabetes (1894)
- An Address On Hepatic Inadequacy And Its Relation To Irregular Gout (1901)
- The Therapeutics of Mineral Springs and Climates (1904)

== See also ==
- List of eponymous medical treatments
