= Hartmann's operation =

Surgical resection of the large intestine

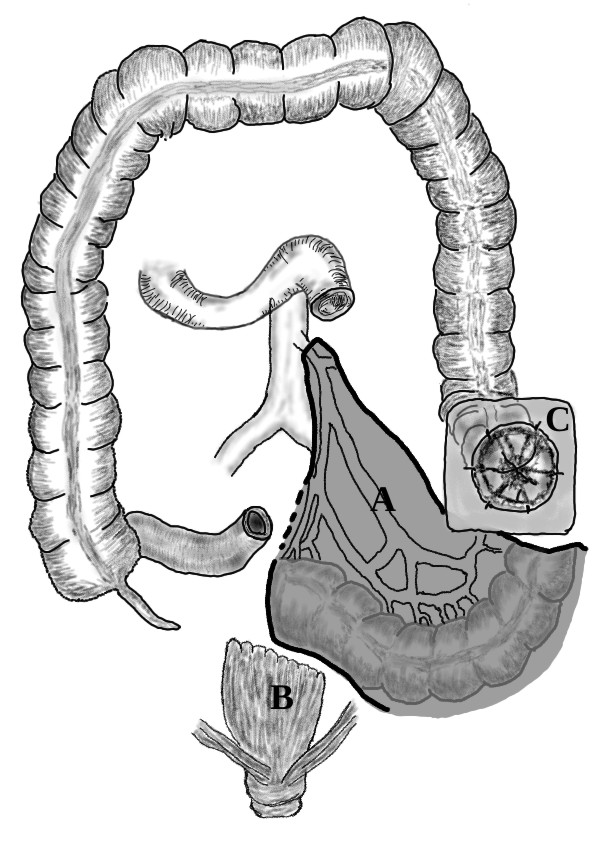
- Hartmann's operation: A - extended sigmoid resection (gray); B - rectal stump closed; C - colostomy.
- Other names: Hartmann's procedure
- ICD-9-CM: 45.75

A proctosigmoidectomy, Hartmann's operation or Hartmann's procedure is the surgical resection of the rectosigmoid colon with closure of the anorectal stump and formation of an end colostomy. It was used to treat colon cancer or inflammation (proctosigmoiditis, proctitis, diverticulitis, volvulus, etc.). Currently, its use is limited to emergency surgery when immediate anastomosis is not possible, or more rarely it is used palliatively in patients with colorectal tumours.

The Hartmann's procedure with a proximal end colostomy or ileostomy is the most common operation carried out by general surgeons for management of malignant obstruction of the distal colon. During this procedure, the lesion is removed, the distal bowel closed intraperitoneally, and the proximal bowel diverted with a stoma.

The indications for this procedure include:

a. Localized or generalized peritonitis caused by perforation of the bowel secondary to the cancer
b. Viable but injured proximal bowel that, in the opinion of the operating surgeon, precludes safe anastomosis
c. Complicated diverticulitis
d. Elective resection of rectal cancer or distal colon cancer in patients deemed unfit for anterior resection with anastomosis

Use of the Hartmann's procedure initially had a mortality rate of 8.8%. Currently, the overall mortality rate is lower but varies greatly depending on indication for surgery. One study showed no statistically significant difference in morbidity or mortality between laparoscopic versus open Hartmann procedure.

== Etymology and history ==
The procedure was first described in 1921 by French surgeon Henri Albert Hartmann. The original two-paragraph article in French together with an English translation by Thomas Pézier and a modern commentary is available. The procedure is described in detail in his book, Chirurgie du Rectum, which was published in 1931 and constituted volume 8 of his Travaux de Chirurgie.
