= Alfred Auvard =

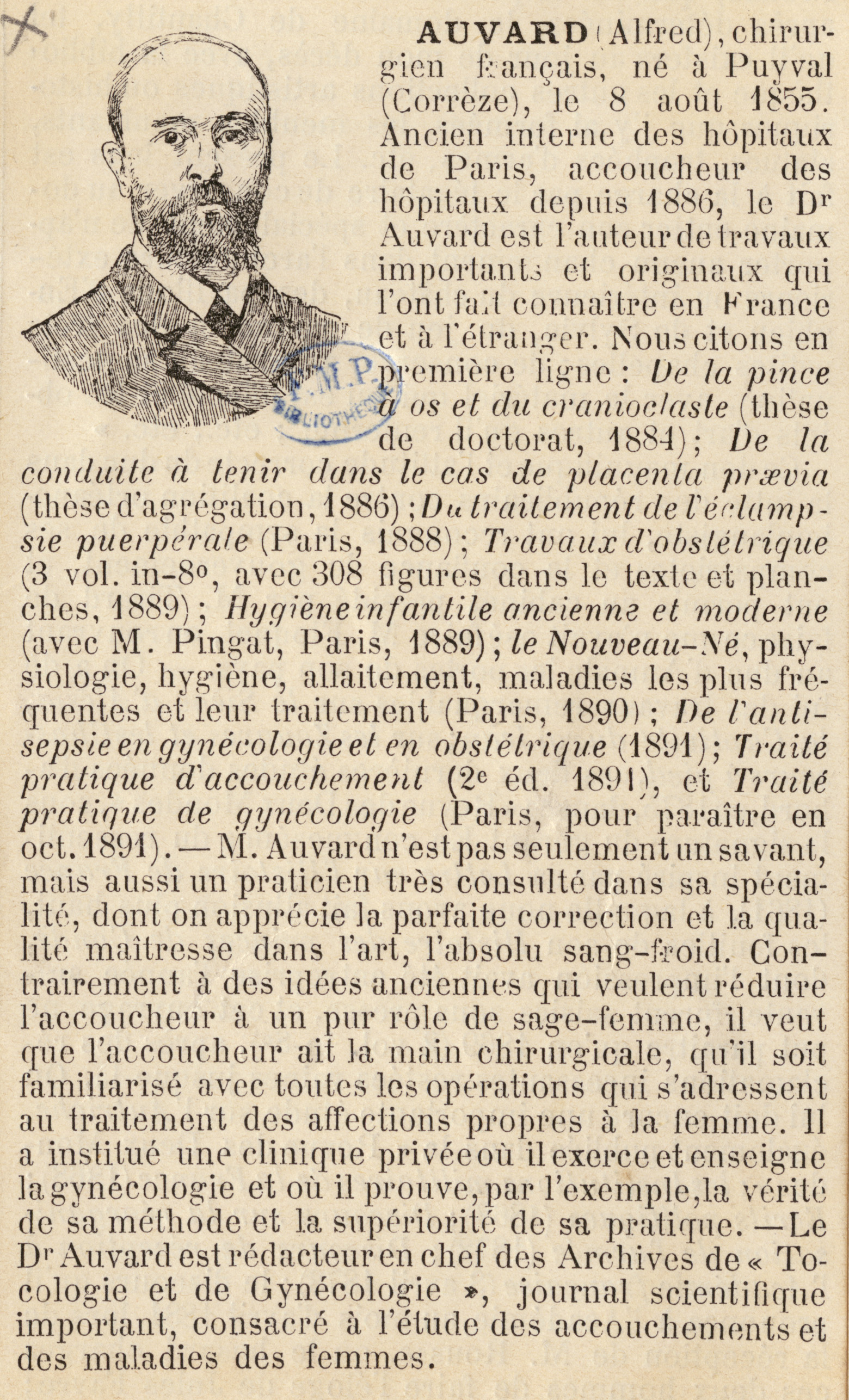
- Born: Pierre-Victor Alfred Auvard; 8 August 1855; Segonzac, Corrèze, France
- Died: 22 November 1940 (aged 85)
- Medical career
- Profession: physician
- Sub-specialties: obstetrics and gynecology
- Notable works: Auvard couveuse
- Awards: Chevalier of the Legion of Honour (1896)

Signature
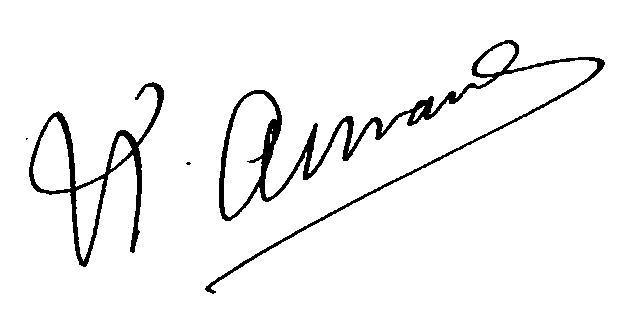

Alfred Auvard; (Pierre-Victor Alfred Auvard; 8 August 1855 – 22 November 1940) was a French obstetrician and gynecologist born in the department of Corrèze.

He studied medicine in Paris, and in 1879 became interne des hôpitaux. In 1882 he furthered his studies in Germany (Leipzig, Dresden, Berlin), and in 1884 received his doctorate with a thesis titled De la pince à os et du cranioclaste. Later he maintained a private OB/GYN clinic in Paris.

During the 1880s, he introduced the "Auvard couveuse", an inexpensive incubator that became widely popular in the latter part of the 19th century. Other eponyms in the field of obstetrics that bear his name are: "Auvard maneuver" - a procedure for extraction of the placenta; "Auvard's vaginal speculum", and "Auvard's basiotribe" - an instrument that is a combination of a craniotomy forceps and a cranioclast.

== Selected publications ==
- Traitement de la métrite parenchymateuse par les scarifications du col de l'utérus (1880)
- De la pince à os et du cranioclaste. Étude historique et expérimentale (1884)
- De la conduite à tenir dans les cas de placenta praevia (1886)
- De la Couveuse pour enfants (1888)
- L'hypnotisme et la suggestion en obstétrique (1888)
- Du traitement de l'eclampsie puerpérale (Paris 1888) - Treatment for puerperal eclampsia.
- Embryotome céphalique combiné (1889)
- Travaux d'obstétrique (three volumes 1889) - Obstetrical works.
- Hygiène infantile ancienne et moderne (with Pingat: 1889) - Ancient and modern child hygiene.
- Traité pratique d'accouchements (1890) - Practical treatise on birthing.
- Le nouveau-né; physiologie, hygiène, allaitement, maladies les plus fréquentes et leur traitement (1890) - On the newborn; physiology, hygiene, nursing, the most common illnesses and their treatment.
- De l'antisepsie gynécologie et en obstétrique (1891) - Antiseptics in gynecology and obstetrics.
- Formulaire gynécologique illustré (1892)
- Formulaire obstétrical illustré (1892)
- Gynécologie. Séméiologie géni (1892)
- Menstruation et fécondation, physiologie et pathologie (1892)
- Planches murales pour l'enseignement de la gynécologie, tirées en plusieurs couleurs (1892)
- Anesthésie chirurgicale et obstétricale (1893)
- Guide de thérapeutique générale et spéciale (1893)
- Thérapeutique obstétricale (1893)
- De la Stérilité chez la femme (1896)
- Thérapeutique gynécologique (1896)
- L'Évoluisme (1914)
- Aurore nouvelle (1917)
- Aum (essence des religions) (1918)
- Maladie (hystérie, neurasthénie, lésion) (1918)
- Maya (monade dans l'homme) (1918)
- Moksha (libération de la monade) (1918)
- Nada (cycle d'une monade) (1918)
- Vie (conscience, matière, force) (1918)
- Bhagavad Gita (traduite et annotée) (1919)
- Passionnalité (l'homme de désir) (1919)
- Science des Védas (Doctrine évoluiste) (1919)
- Spiritualité (l'homme de conscience) (1919)
- Santé, comment se bien porter (d'après l'enseignement théosophique) (1920)
- Bonheur (Art d'être heureux) d'après l'enseignement théosophique (1921)
- Ésotérisme (Base de l'évoluisme) (1921)
- Malheur (problème de la douleur) d'après l'enseignement théosophique (1921)
- Énigme de la vie (Clé de l'évoluisme) (1922)
- Sociologie (Évoluisme social) (1924)
