= Eliza Sheffield =

Entrepreneur and socialite (1856–1942)

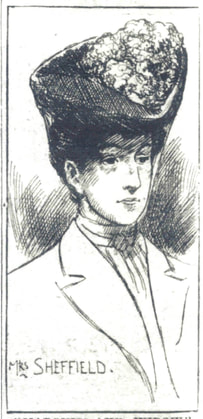
1905 portrait drawing

Eliza Dinah Sheffield (née Fairchild; 6 September 1856 – 28 November 1942) was an English entrepreneur and socialite. Born into a working class family in Southampton, England, she rose through the ranks of society through marriage to Henry Digby Sheffield, a minor aristocrat. Since Fairchild was a barmaid at the time of their marriage, they had to invent a more prestigious background for her and she took the name Evelyn Diana Turnour Sheffield, presenting herself as the child of a British naval officer and a Spanish aristocrat.

After her husband died in 1888, Sheffield continued to engage with high society and through both romantic and friendly relationships inherited large sums of money, allowing her to pursue her own interests. In the 1890s, she was a co-inventor of the Tallerman–Sheffield hot-air treatment (or human bake oven), a medical contraption in which patients were baked alive to cure various ailments. Her social standing took a great hit in 1905 following a court case in which she attempted to sue John Townshend, 6th Marquess Townshend for withdrawing an offer of marriage. Sheffield's aristocratic identity was revealed as a forgery during the trial, though she continued to go by her assumed name until her death. Sheffield was a member of the occult Hermetic Order of the Golden Dawn.

== Early life ==
Eliza Dinah Fairchild was born on 6 September 1856 into a working class family in Southampton, England. Her father George Frampton Fairchild was steward on board a ship. Her mother's name was also Eliza Dinah Fairchild (née Johnson).

Eliza and her brothers attended a school owned and operated by the Peninsular and Oriental Steam Navigation Company in Southampton, until the age of at least 14. After finishing school she moved to London, where she worked as a barmaid. She may have worked at Fenton's Hotel in the St James's district.

== Rise to wealth and career ==
=== Aristocracy and money ===
In July 1877, the 20-year-old Eliza married the 44-year-old Henry Digby Sheffield, a minor aristocrat. Sheffield was the younger brother of Sir Robert Sheffield, 5th Baronet. Together, Eliza and Henry invented a new background story for Eliza to increase her social standing; marrying a barmaid would otherwise have been social suicide for Henry.

Eliza took the name Evelyn Diana Turnour Fairchild and claimed to have been born in Cádiz in Spain as the daughter of a Spanish aristocrat and a British naval officer. She also claimed to have been orphaned from a young age. Her mother was supposedly the Vicomtesse D'Lardio and her father was named Edward G. Turnour, part of the aristocratic Turnour family. The background story was designed to sound plausible yet be almost impossible to verify; the Turnour family was a real but large aristocratic family and Edward was a common name in the family.

The Sheffields lived a life of leisure and spent much time in Canada and the United States engaging in fishing and big-game hunting. Henry died in Jacksonville, Florida on 22 October 1888 while Evelyn was back home in England. They had no children together.

Although she was recently widowed, Sheffield's name was soon after her husband's death linked to a number of different men. She openly began a relationship with the big-game hunter and landowner John Lewis Garden from Suffolk (1833–1891). Garden was at the time the estranged husband of Princess Caroline Murat, daughter of Lucien, 3rd Prince Murat and granddaughter of Joachim Murat, King of Naples. The two had apparently had a relationship since before 1884. Garden died in 1891. After a lengthy court case, Sheffield secured an inheritance of £7,000 from his estate, a huge sum of money at the time. This money enabled her to pursue her own interests for the rest of her life, without having to work again. Sheffield had the year prior also inherited money from Sir John Sebright, who for some time had acted as her guardian and upon his death in 1890 left her with £500 alongside his photographs and albums.

=== Hot-air treatment ===
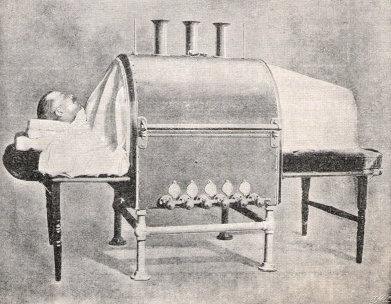
Illustration of a patient undergoing Tallerman–Sheffield hot-air treatment

Sheffield had an interest in medical treatments from an early age and at times pondered her own ideas for treatments. In 1893, she heard that the engineer Thomas Henry Rees had taken a patent for the use of hot dry air for several medical issues, an idea she herself had also come up with. The two got into contact and together they took a patent for "An Improved Medical Dry Bath for Applying Superheated Steam or Gases and Medicines in Vapour to the Human Body". Soon after taking this patent, another investor became involved in the project, Lewis A. Tallerman.

Sheffield and Tallerman, who were supposedly "very friendly", together took a patent in Victoria, Australia in 1894. The developed version of their treatment became known as the "Tallerman–Sheffield hot-air treatment" and received scholarly interest, being publicised in the medical journal The Lancet. The patented "Tallerman–Sheffield Hot-Air Treatment of Disease" was used to treat joint problems and rheumatism through hot dry air baths (essentially "baking" the patient); the technique was tested successfully at St Bartholomew's Hospital in London in 1894 and quickly began being used in other hospitals in the city as well as internationally in cities such as Paris, Berlin, Baden-Baden and Philadelphia. They ensured that the treatment would be available for free so that poor people would have access to it.

In 1900, the three partners began to feud over various legal disputes. Rees was bought out by Tallerman for a pittance and he also sought to oust Sheffield from the business resulting an acrimonious exchange of letters in the press; Sheffield appears to not have been able to adequately protect her interests in regard to the treatment and she was ultimately sidelined deriving little profit from the venture. Tallerman worked tirelessly to expunge Sheffield's name and financial association from Tallerman Institutes's hot-air treatment. Sheffield maintained an interest in the medical field for the rest of her life and remained proud of her contribution to the hot-air treatment. In a census from 1911 her occupation was listed as "medical" and the national ID Card register of 1939 described her as the "inventor of medical dry air baths and pads".

== Later life ==
=== Golden Dawn ===
Rose Cross of the Golden Dawn

Sheffield lived in a sequence of larger houses in London. In 1900, she lived on Bassett Road in North Kensington and in 1911 she lived in Bromley. In 1901 she was initiated into the Hermetic Order of the Golden Dawn, a London-based secret society. Her initiation took place on 14 June at the order's Isis-Urania Temple in London. The members of the order chose personal mottos in Latin; Sheffield's motto was Vires Animat Veritas.

It is unknown how far Sheffield advanced within the order. The Golden Dawn was splintered in 1903 and it is not known whether Sheffield joined any of its successors.

=== Court case ===
Sheffield met John Townshend, 6th Marquess Townshend in 1903 and the two quickly took a liking to each other. Townshend was 38 years old and Sheffield was 48, though claimed she was much younger. The two were introduced to each other by Townshend's friend and confidant Arthur Geoffrey Robins after Townshend had returned home to England from a failed trip to America in search of a rich wife. Townshend was during this time unbeknownst to Sheffield heavily in debt; he had recently sold many of his family's valuable assets, including nearly 200 paintings by artists such as Thomas Gainsborough, Peter Paul Rubens, and Anthony van Dyck, and had leased Raynham Hall, the family estate.

Both Sheffield and Townshend believed the other to be wealthy and intended to use this to their own benefit; Sheffield wanted wealth and a formal title to securely confirm her place in high society whereas Townshend wanted a rich wife to restore the fortune of his family. Whenever the two engaged in some activity, Sheffield ended up paying since she appeared to be very wealthy. On 16 September 1903, Townshend proposed marriage but the offer was soon rescinded when he discovered that she was not as wealthy as he had believed. The legal excuse for the withdrawal of the offer was that "the plaintiff was an adventuress and a clairvoyant and otherwise unfit to become Marchioness".

Insulted by this description, Sheffield sued Townshend in 1905, both for breach of promise and to defend her reputation and image. The trial commenced on 23 February.e=":2" /> The case turned into a high profile scandal and was widely publicised in national newspapers such as News of the World. Though Sheffield's counsel succeeded in establishing the breach of promise, Townshend's counsel started to expose her real name and origins and in response Sheffield's council immediately withdrew her action thus ending the trial. However the damage was done and the details of Sheffield's real and fake identity were widely publicised in the media. The loss of the case was a disaster for her, not only costing her money in the form of legal costs but also tarnishing her reputation and place in society.

=== Death ===
Sheffield died on 28 November 1942, aged 86. By the time of her death, she had only £300 left; all of this money was left to the engineer Percy Lock. Despite her humble origins being exposed during the 1905 court case, she maintained her invented first names, Evelyn and Diana, throughout her later life and used them even in official documents. Despite this, her death certificate called her Eliza Sheffield. It is likely that Sheffield's life story had at least some influence on the play Pygmalion (1913) by George Bernard Shaw, in particular on the protagonist Eliza Doolittle.
