= Collis gastroplasty =

Surgical extension of the esophagus prior to Nissen fundoplication

- Specialty: Gastroenterology

A Collis gastroplasty is a surgical procedure performed when the surgeon desires to create a Nissen fundoplication, but the portion of esophagus inferior to the diaphragm is too short. Thus, there is not enough esophagus to wrap. A vertical incision is made in the stomach parallel to the left border of the esophagus. This effectively lengthens the esophagus. The stomach fundus can then be wrapped around the neo-esophagus, thus reducing reflux of stomach acid into the esophagus.

In fact, gastroplasty can be used when the length of the intra-abdominal esophagus is short and for anti-reflux action such as Nissen fundoplication, it is necessary to increase the intra-abdominal length of the esophagus. At this time, part of the upper part of the stomach is separated by a stepper, i.e. the stapler fires longitudinally along the esophagus and increases the length of the stomach inside the abdomen. At this time, a tongue is created from the stomach that can be easily rotated on the new esophagus and all kinds of fundoplication operations such as Nissen fundoplication can be done easily. It was devised by John Leigh Collis (1911–2003), a British cardiothoracic surgeon, in 1957.
