= Mathieu Jaboulay =

French surgeon

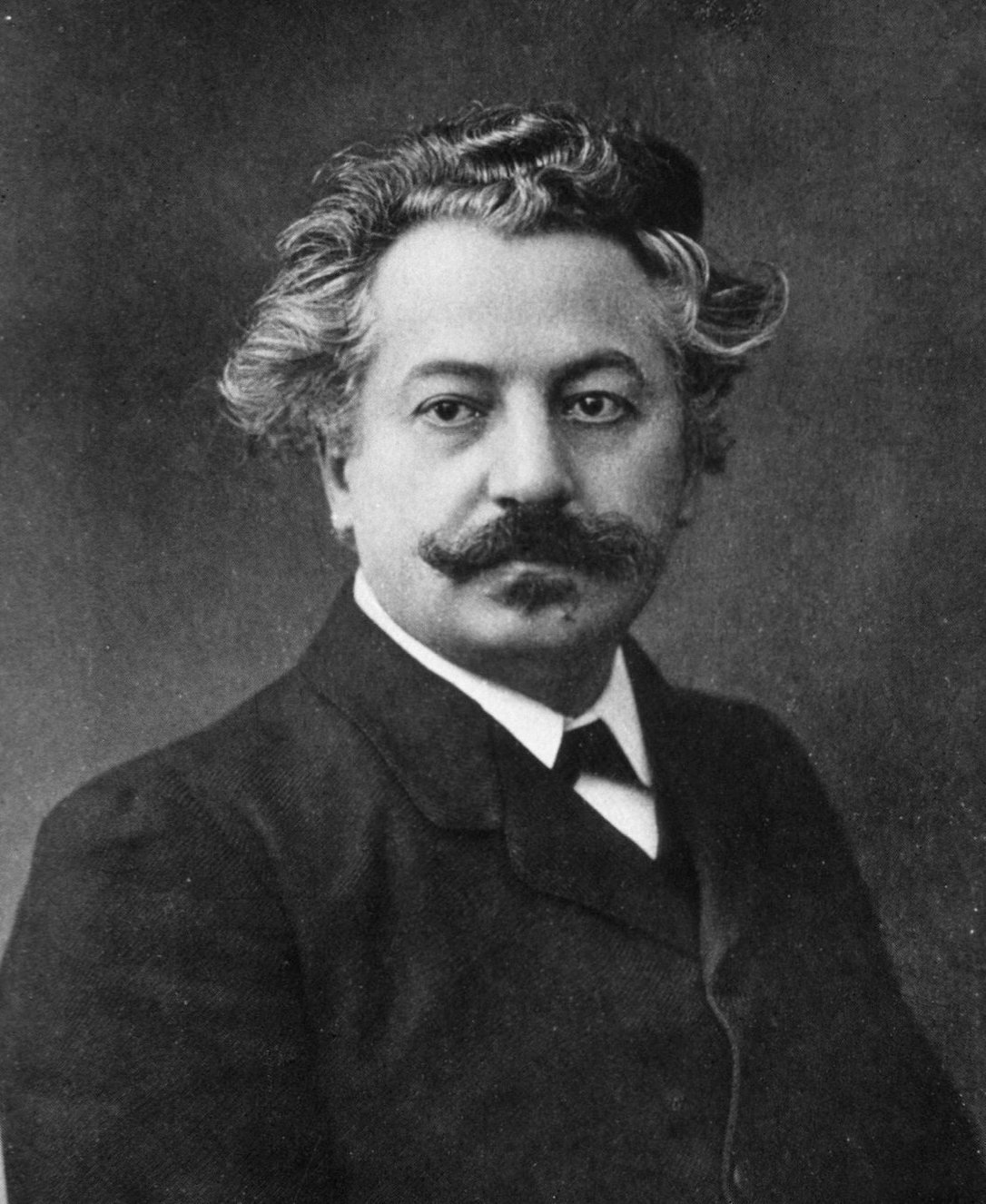
Mathieu Jaboulay (1860-1913)

Mathieu Jaboulay (5 July 1860 – 4 November 1913) was a French surgeon born in Saint-Genis-Laval, a city in the department of Rhône. He is remembered for introduction of new surgical procedures, as well as his work involving techniques of vascular anastomosis.

He studied and practiced medicine in Lyon, where in 1902 he became a professor of clinical surgery. Two of his better known students at Lyon were Alexis Carrel (1873-1944) and René Leriche (1879-1955).

In 1892 he introduced the side-to-side gastroduodenostomy, an operation used when the pylorus and proximal duodenum are badly scarred, and in 1894 he performed the first inter-ilio abdominal amputation or hemipelvectomy, a surgery involving amputation of the entire leg through the sacroiliac joint. This operation is sometimes referred to as "Jaboulay's amputation".

He is credited with performing the first sympathectomic operation for alleviation of vascular disease. He described this surgery in a treatise titled Chirurgie du grand sympathique et du corps thyroïde (Surgery of the sympathetic system and thyroid gland). Also, he introduced a procedure for arterial anastomosis (Jaboulay's method), and is the namesake of "Jaboulay's button", described as two buttonlike cylinders used in performing lateral intestinal anastomosis without the need of sutures.

In 1906, Jaboulay made the first attempts at human kidney transplantation when he transplanted pig and goat kidneys into patients with chronic kidney failure. The operations were unsuccessful.

== Selected writings ==
- De la gastro-duodénostomie. Archives provinciales de chirurgie, Paris, 1892, 1: 551–554.
- La désarticulation interilio-abdominale. Lyon médical, 1894, 75: 507–510. Interilio-abdominal amputation first described.
- Chirurgie du grand sympathique et du corps thyroïde (les différents goitres). Articles originaux at observations réunis et publiés par E. Martin. Paris, O. Doin, 1900.
- Chirurgie des centres nerveux, des viscères et des membres. two volumes. Lyon/Paris, 1902.
