= William Ernest Miles =

British surgeon

- Born: 15 January 1869; Trinidad
- Died: 24 September 1947 (aged 78); London
- Known for: Miles' operation
- Scientific career
- Fields: surgeon

William Ernest Miles (15 January 1869 – 24 September 1947) was an English surgeon known for the Miles' operation: an abdomino-perineal excision for rectal cancer.

Sources differ as to whether Miles was born in Trinidad or in Uppingham, England. He received his medical education at St Bartholomew's Hospital, from where he graduated in 1891. At age 25, he became a fellow of the Royal College of Surgeons of England. He became interested in rectal cancer under the influence of Harrison Cripps, whose distinguished career at St Bartholomew's was focused on rectal and abdominal surgery.

Formerly, surgery for rectal cancer was by perineal excision, which was less efficient in removing neoplastic tissue but easier to perform and carried less risks for the patient. Miles studied the reasons for recurrence following perineal resection and showed that many cases involved the upwards spread of cancer. His approach was to combine surgery via the perineum with surgery from above the cancer via the abdomen, known as abdomino-perineal resection. Miles perfected this technique over a number of years from 1907, eventually achieving long term remissions and gaining the acceptance of other surgeons. Miles' operation became the gold standard for surgical treatment of rectal cancer.

== Bibliography ==
- Ellis, H (March 1986). "Eponyms in oncology. William Ernest Miles (1869–1947)". Eur J Surg Oncol. 12 (1): 85. ISSN 0748-7983. PMID 3514276.
- Chessin, David B; Guillem Jose G (July 2005). "Abdominoperineal resection for rectal cancer: historic perspective and current issues". Surg. Oncol. Clin. N. Am. 14 (3): 569–86, vii. doi:10.1016/j.soc.2005.04.002. ISSN 1055-3207. PMID 15978430.
- Hoch, J; Smrcka Z (June 2009). "100 years of Miles' surgery--W. Ernest Miles 1869-1947". Rozhledy V Chirurgii: Měsíčník Československé Chirurgické Společnosti. 88 (6): 288–91. ISSN 0035-9351. PMID 19642317.
- Corman, M L (April 1980). "Classic articles in colonic and rectal surgery. A method of performing abdominoperineal excision for carcinoma of the rectum and of the terminal portion of the pelvic colon: by W. Ernest Miles, 1869-1947". Dis. Colon Rectum. 23 (3): 202–5. doi:10.1007/BF02587628. ISSN 0012-3706. PMID 6991231.
- Holleb, A I (1971). "William Ernest Miles (1869–1947)". CA: A Cancer Journal for Clinicians. 21 (6): 360. doi:10.3322/canjclin.21.6.360. ISSN 0007-9235. PMID 5001852.
- GILBERTSEN, V A (1964). "CONTRIBUTIONS OF WILLIAM ERNEST MILES TO SURGERY OF THE RECTUM FOR CANCER". Dis. Colon Rectum. 7 (5): 375–80. doi:10.1007/BF02616845. ISSN 0012-3706. PMID 14204398.
- MATT, J G (December 1958). "Miles and his operation; a semi-centenary celebration". The Journal of the Oklahoma State Medical Association. 51 (12): 691–4. ISSN 0030-1876. PMID 13611588.
