= Diverticulitis =

Digestive disease of the large intestine

- Other names: Colonic diverticulitis
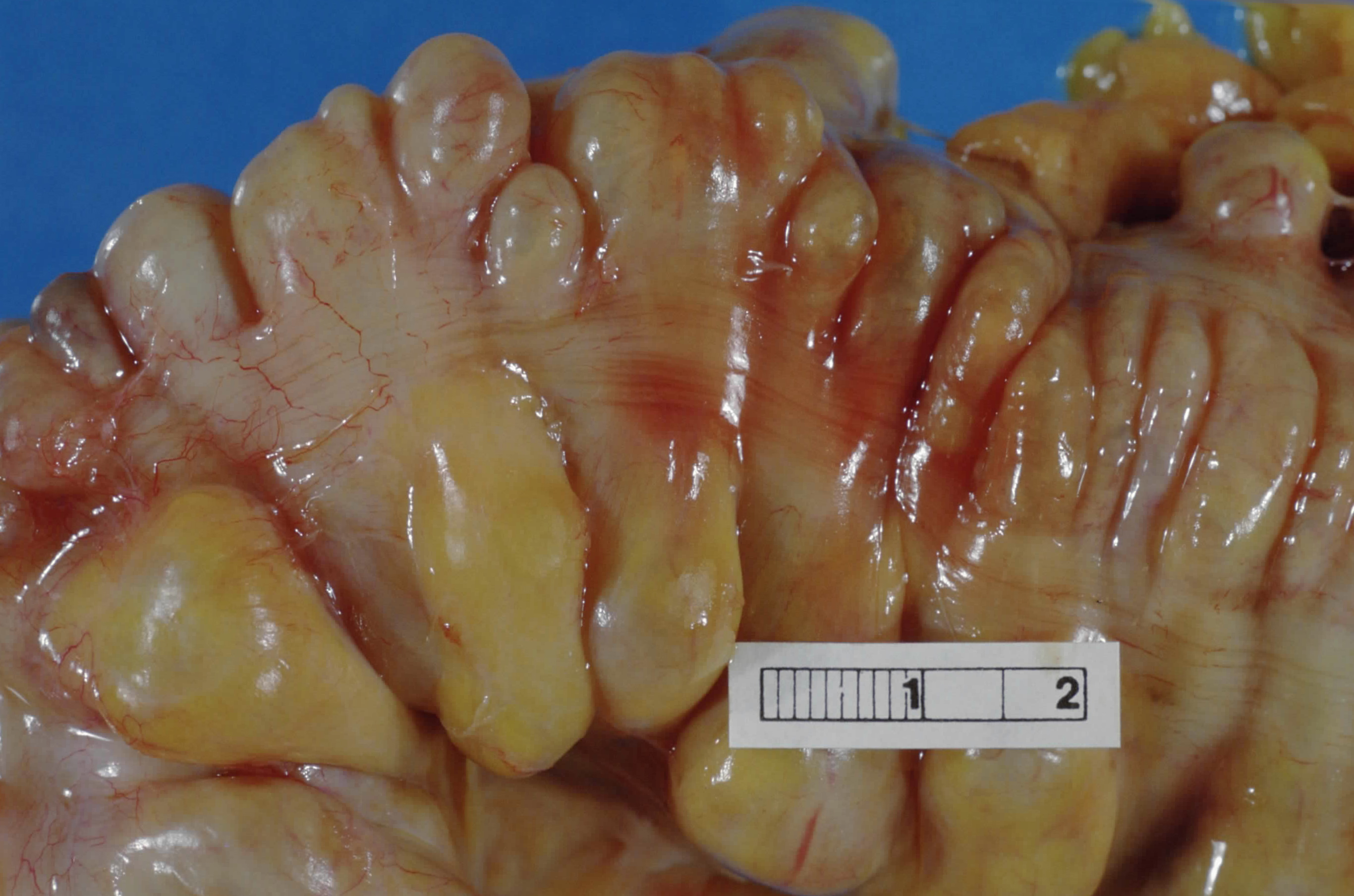
- Section of the large bowel (sigmoid colon) showing multiple pouches (diverticula). The diverticula appear on either side of the longitudinal muscle bundle (taenium), which runs horizontally across the specimen in an arc.
- Specialty: General surgery
- Symptoms: Abdominal pain, fever, nausea, diarrhea, constipation, blood in the stool
- Complications: Abscess, fistula, bowel perforation
- Usual onset: Sudden, age > 50
- Causes: Uncertain
- Risk factors: Obesity, lack of exercise, smoking, family history, nonsteroidal anti-inflammatory drugs
- Diagnostic method: Blood tests, CT scan, colonoscopy, lower gastrointestinal series
- Differential diagnosis: Irritable bowel syndrome
- Prevention: Mesalazine, rifaximin
- Treatment: Antibiotics, liquid diet, hospital admission
- Frequency: 3.3% (developed world)

Diverticulitis, also called colonic diverticulitis, is a gastrointestinal disease characterized by inflammation of abnormal pouches—diverticula—that can develop in the wall of the large intestine. Symptoms typically include lower abdominal pain of sudden onset, but the onset may also occur over a few days. There may also be nausea, diarrhea or constipation. Fever or blood in the stool suggests a complication. People may experience a single attack, repeated attacks, or ongoing "smoldering" diverticulitis.

The causes of diverticulitis are unclear. Risk factors may include obesity, lack of exercise, smoking, a family history of the disease, and use of nonsteroidal anti-inflammatory drugs (NSAIDs). The role of a low fiber diet as a risk factor is unclear. Having pouches in the large intestine that are not inflamed is known as diverticulosis. Inflammation occurs in 10% and 25% at some point in time and is due to a bacterial infection. Diagnosis is typically by CT scan. However, blood tests, colonoscopy, or a lower gastrointestinal series may also be supportive. The differential diagnoses include irritable bowel syndrome.

Preventive measures include altering risk factors such as obesity, physical inactivity, and smoking. Mesalazine and rifaximin appear useful for preventing attacks in those with diverticulosis. Avoiding nuts and seeds as a preventive measure is no longer recommended since there is no evidence that these play a role in initiating inflammation in the diverticula. For mild diverticulitis, antibiotics by mouth and a liquid diet are recommended. For severe cases, intravenous antibiotics, hospital admission, and complete bowel rest may be recommended. Probiotics are of unclear value. Complications such as abscess formation, fistula formation, and perforation of the colon may require surgery.

The disease is common in the Western world and uncommon in Africa and Asia. In the Western world about 35% of people have diverticulosis while it affects less than 1% of those in rural Africa, and 4–15% of those may go on to develop diverticulitis. In North America and Europe the abdominal pain is usually on the left lower side (sigmoid colon), while in Asia it is usually on the right (ascending colon). The disease becomes more frequent with age, ranging from 5% for those under 40 years of age to 50% over the age of 60. It has also become more common in all parts of the world. In 2003 in Europe, it resulted in approximately 13,000 deaths. It is the most frequent anatomic disease of the colon. Costs associated with diverticular disease were around US$2.4 billion a year in the United States in 2013.

== Signs and symptoms ==
Diverticulitis typically presents with lower quadrant abdominal pain of a sudden onset. Patients commonly have elevated C-reactive protein and a high white blood cell count. In Asia it is usually on the right (ascending colon), while in North America and Europe, the abdominal pain is usually on the left lower side (sigmoid colon). There may also be fever, nausea, diarrhea or constipation, and blood in the stool. Diverticulosis is associated with more frequent bowel movements, contrary to the widespread belief that patients with diverticulosis are constipated.

=== Complications ===
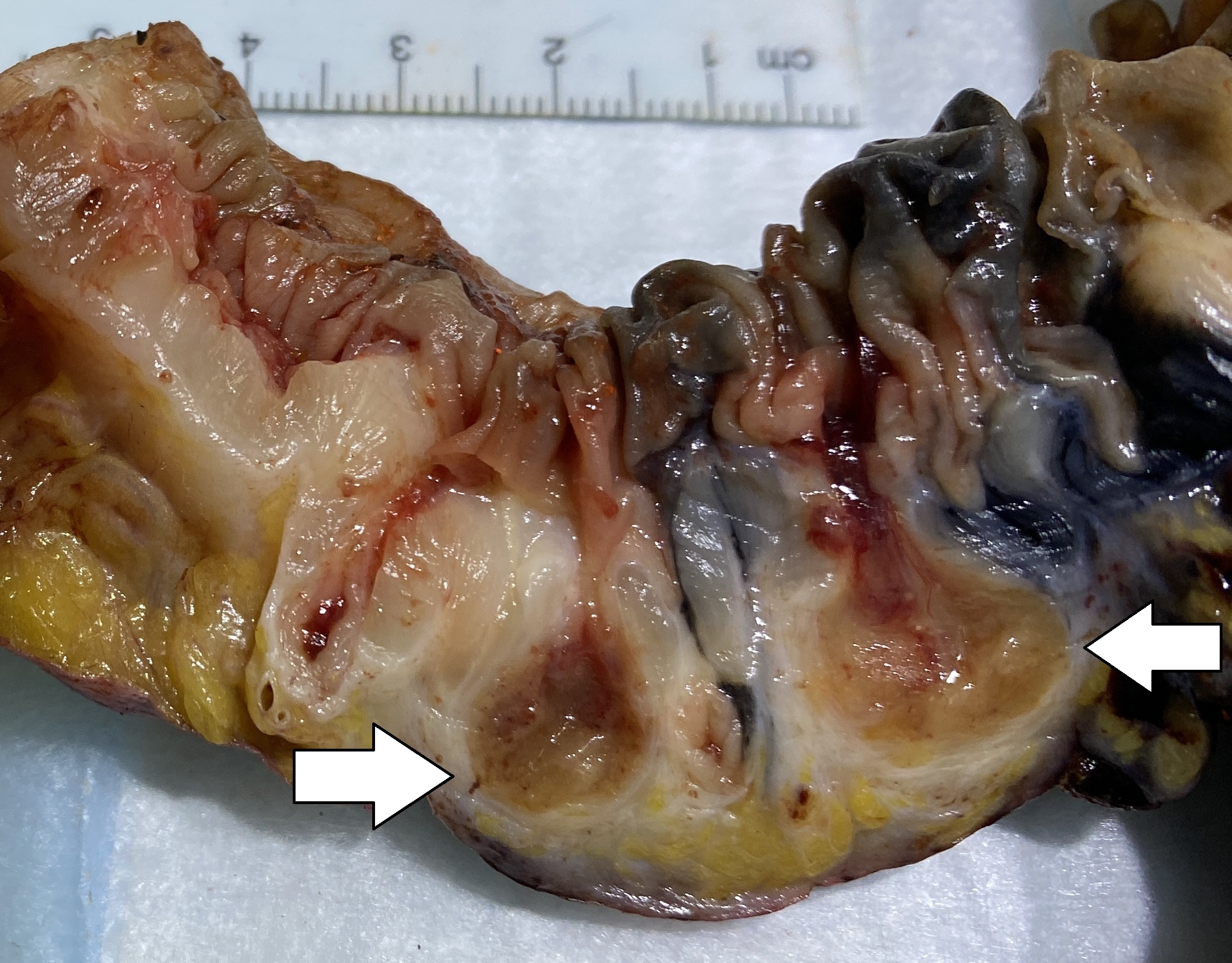
Gross pathology of a longitudinally opened colon (inside/mucosa at top and outside/serosa at bottom), showing diverticulitis with two diverticular abscesses (white arrows). The dark coloration at right is previous colon tattooing for localization.

In complicated diverticulitis, an inflamed diverticulum can rupture, allowing bacteria to subsequently infect externally from the colon. If the infection spreads to the lining of the abdominal cavity (the peritoneum), peritonitis results. Sometimes, inflamed diverticula can cause narrowing of the bowel, leading to an obstruction. In some cases, the affected part of the colon adheres to the bladder or other organs in the pelvic cavity, causing a fistula, or creating an abnormal connection between an organ and adjacent structure or another organ (in the case of diverticulitis, the colon, and an adjacent organ).

Related pathologies may include:

- Bowel obstruction
- Peritonitis
- Abscess
- Fistula
- Bleeding
- Strictures

== Causes and prevention ==
The causes of diverticulitis are poorly understood. Formation of diverticula is regarded as likely due to interactions of age, diet, colonic microbiota, genetic factors, colonic motility, and changes in colonic structure.

=== Factors associated with increased diverticulitis risk ===
==== Genetics ====
A 2021 review estimated that 50% of the risk of diverticulitis was attributable to genetic factors. A 2012 study estimated that heritability made up 40% of cause and non-shared environmental effects 60%.

==== Presence of other ill-health ====
Conditions that increase the risk of developing diverticulitis include arterial hypertension and immunosuppression. Low levels of vitamin D have been associated with an increased risk of diverticulitis.

==== Frequency of bowel movement ====
A 2022 study found that more frequent bowel movements appeared to be a risk factor for subsequent diverticulitis both in men and women.

==== Weight ====
Obesity has been regarded as a risk factor for diverticulitis. Some studies have found a correlation of higher prevalence of diverticulitis with overweight and obese bodyweight. There is some debate if this is causal.

==== Diet ====
It is unclear what role dietary fiber plays in diverticulitis. It is often stated that a diet low in fiber is a risk factor; however, the evidence to support this is unclear. A 2012 study found that a high-fiber diet and increased frequency of bowel movements are associated with greater, rather than lower, prevalence of diverticulosis.

There is no evidence to suggest that avoiding nuts and seeds prevents the progression of diverticulosis to an acute case of diverticulitis. In fact, it appears that a higher intake of nuts and corn could help to avoid diverticulitis in adult males.

Red meat consumption, particularly unprocessed red meat, has been linked to a higher risk of diverticulitis.

A 2017 analysis found that a dietary pattern high in red meat, refined grains, and high-fat dairy was associated with an increased risk of incident diverticulitis. In contrast, a dietary pattern high in fruits, vegetables, and whole grains was associated with decreased risk. Men in the highest quintile of Western dietary pattern score had a multivariate hazard ratio (HR) of 1.55 (95% CI, 1.20–1.99) for diverticulitis compared to men in the lowest quintile. Recent dietary intake may be more strongly associated with diverticulitis than long-term intake. The associations between dietary patterns and diverticulitis were largely due to red meat and fiber intake. A systematic review published in 2012 found no high-quality studies, but found that some studies and guidelines favor a high-fiber diet for the treatment of symptomatic disease. A 2011 review found that a high-fiber diet may prevent diverticular disease, and found no evidence for the superiority of low-fiber diets in treating diverticular disease. A 2011 long-term study found that a vegetarian diet and high fiber intake were both associated with lower risks of hospital admission or death from diverticulitis.

While it has been suggested that probiotics may be useful for treatment, the evidence currently neither supports nor refutes this claim.

== Pathology ==
Right-sided diverticula are micro-hernias of the colonic mucosa and submucosa through the colonic muscular layer, where blood vessels penetrate it. Left-sided diverticula are pseudodiverticula, since the herniation is not through all the layers of the colon. Diverticulitis is postulated to develop because of changes inside the colon, including high pressures because of abnormally vigorous contractions.

== Diagnosis ==
Diverticulitis in the left lower quadrant as seen on axial view by a CT scan (the abnormality is within the circled area)

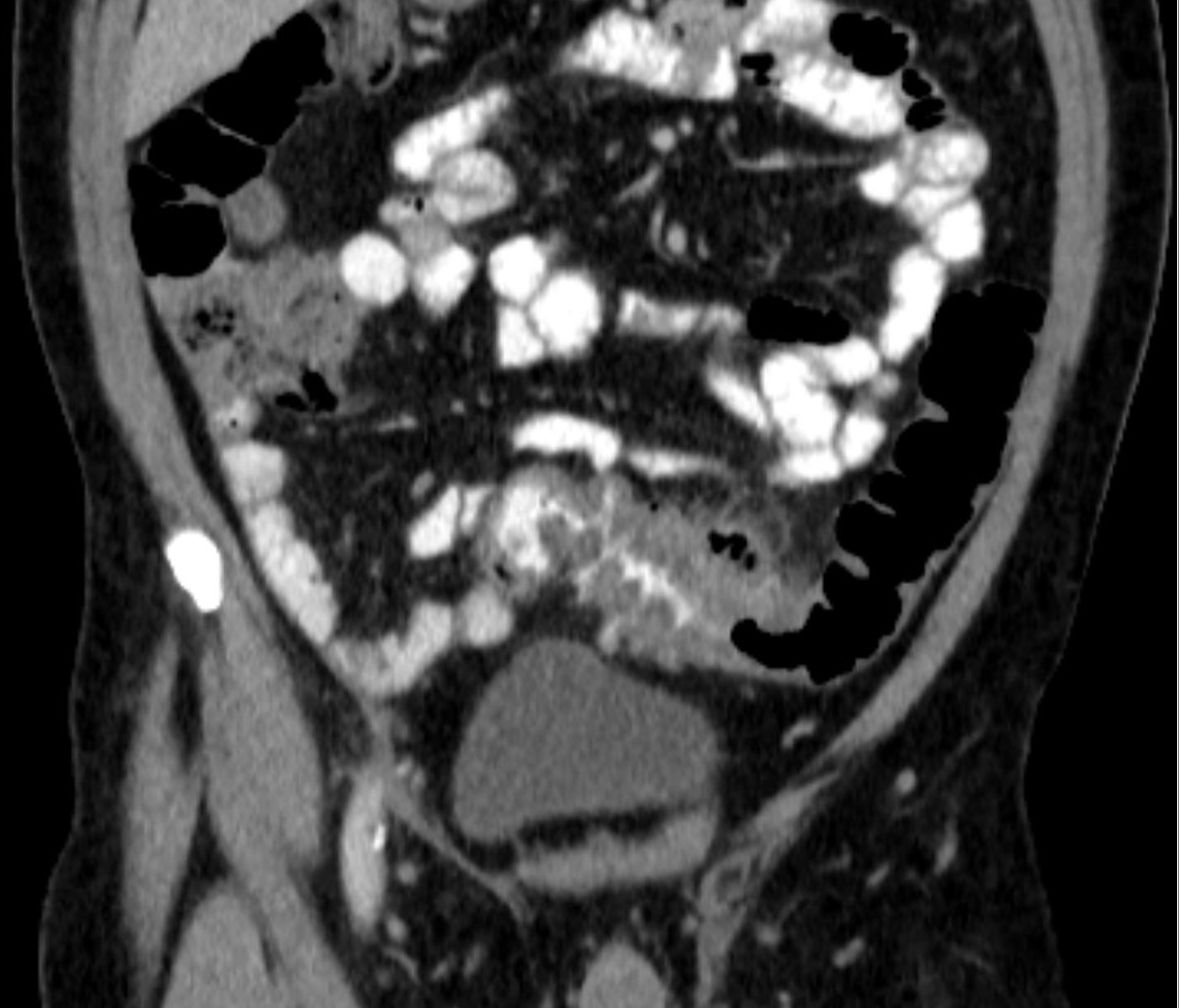
Diverticulitis on a CT scan in a coronal view

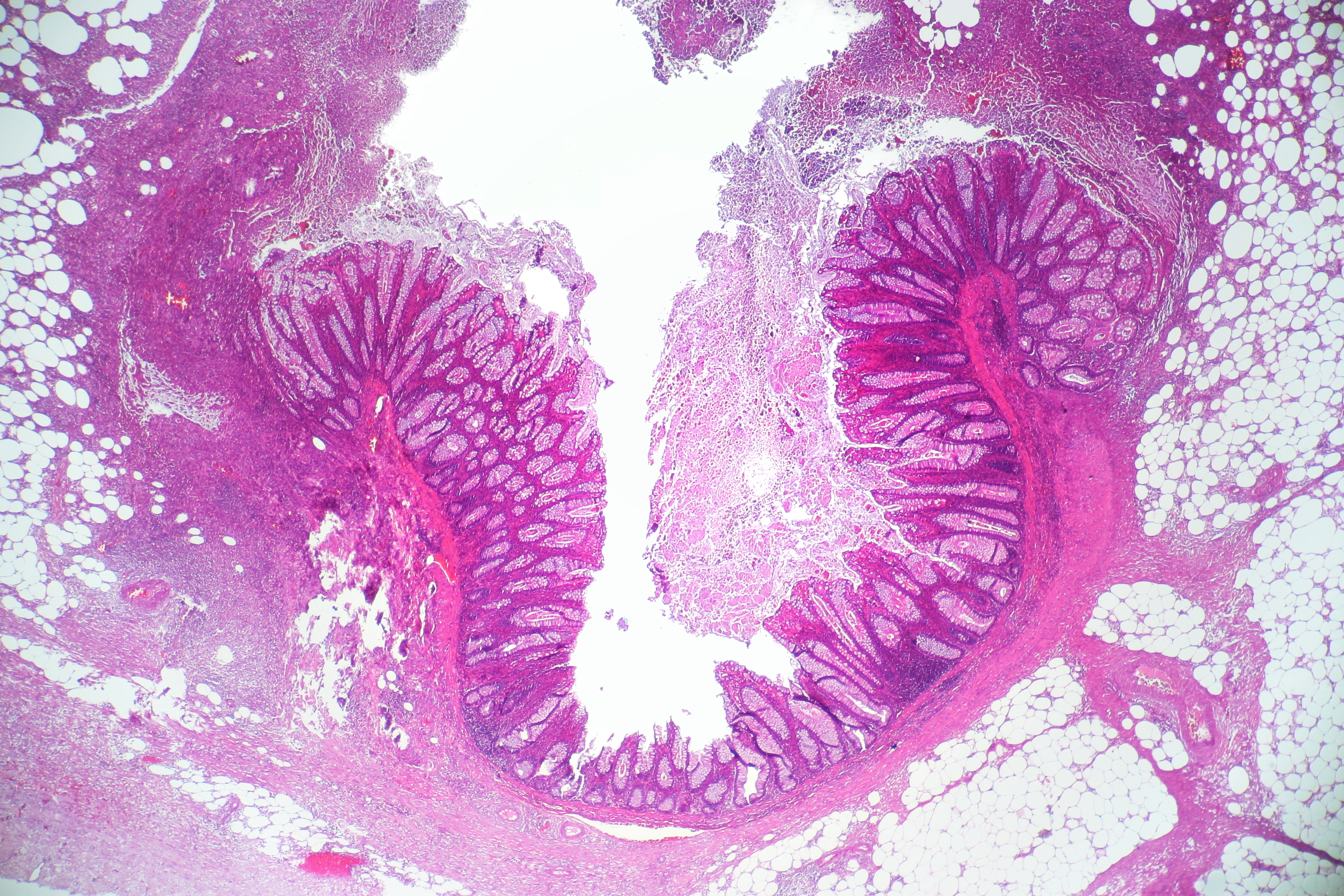
Diverticulitis showing acute purulent inflammation extending into the subserosal adipose tissue

People with the above symptoms are commonly studied with computed tomography, or a CT scan. Ultrasound can provide preliminary investigation for diverticulitis. Amongst the findings that can be seen on ultrasound is a non-compressing outpouching of bowel wall, hypoechoic and thickened wall, or an obstructive fecalith at the bowel wall. Besides, bowel wall oedema with adjacent hyperechoic mesentery can also be seen on ultrasound. However, a CT scan is the mainstay of diagnosing diverticulitis and its complications. The diagnosis of acute diverticulitis is made confidently when the involved segment contains diverticula. CT images reveal localized colon wall thickening, with inflammation extending into the fat surrounding the colon. Amongst the complications that can be seen on CT scan are: abscesses, perforation, pylephlebitis, intestinal obstruction, bleeding, and fistula.

Barium enema and colonoscopy are contraindicated in the acute phase of diverticulitis because of the risk of perforation.

=== Classification by severity ===
==== Uncomplicated vs complicated ====
Uncomplicated acute diverticulitis is defined as localized diverticular inflammation without any abscess or perforation. Complicated diverticulitis additionally includes the presence of abscess, peritonitis, obstruction, stricture and/or fistula. 12% of patients with diverticulitis present with complicated disease.

==== Classification systems ====
At least four classifications by severity have been published in the literature. As of 2015, the 'German Classification' was widely accepted and is as follows:

- Stage 0 – asymptomatic diverticulosis
- Stage 1a – uncomplicated diverticulitis
- Stage 1b – diverticulitis with phlegmonous peridiverticulitis
- Stage 2a – diverticulitis with concealed perforation, and abscess with a diameter of one centimeter or less
- Stage 2b – diverticulitis with abscess greater than one centimeter
- Stage 3a – diverticulitis with symptoms but without complications
- Stage 3b – relapsing diverticulitis without complications
- Stage 3c – relapsing diverticulitis with complications

As of 2022, other classification systems are also used.

The severity of diverticulitis can be radiographically graded by the Hinchey Classification.

==== Smoldering diverticulitis ====
In "smoldering diverticulitis" (SmD), there are frequent relapsing symptoms but no progression to diverticular complications. Approximately 5% of people with diverticulitis experience a variant known as smoldering diverticulitis. Smoldering diverticulitis cases make up 4–10% of diverticulitis surgeries.

=== Differential diagnoses ===
The differential diagnoses include colon cancer, inflammatory bowel disease, ischemic colitis, and irritable bowel syndrome, as well as several urological and gynecological processes. In those with uncomplicated diverticulitis, cancer is present in less than 1% of people.

== Prognosis ==
- Estimates for the proportion of people with diverticulosis who will develop diverticulitis range from 5% to 10% to 25%.
- Most people with uncomplicated diverticulitis recover following medical treatment. The median time to recovery is 14 days. Approximately 5% of people experience smoldering diverticulitis.
- Diverticulitis recurs in around one-third of people – about 50% of recurrences occur within one year, and 90% within 5 years. Recurrence is more common in younger people, those with an abscess at diagnosis, and after an episode of complicated diverticulitis.
- About 5% of people with diverticular disease have complications when followed up for 10–30 years. The risk of complications, such as peritonitis or perforation, is greater during the first episode of diverticulitis, and the risk reduces with each recurrence. People who are immunocompromised have a 5-fold increased risk of recurrence with complications, such as bowel perforation, compared to immunocompetent people.
- The decision criteria for having surgical treatment has been subject to debate and development.
- Following surgical treatment, approximately 25% of people remain symptomatic.

== Treatment ==
In uncomplicated diverticulitis, administration of fluids may be sufficient treatment if no other risk factors are present.

=== Diet ===
Diverticulitis patients may be placed on a low-fiber diet, or a liquid diet, although evidence for improved outcomes through diet has not been found.

=== Medication ===
==== Antibiotics ====
Mild uncomplicated diverticulitis without systemic inflammation should not be treated with antibiotics. For mild, uncomplicated, and non-purulent cases of acute diverticulitis, symptomatic treatment, IV fluids, and bowel rest have no worse outcome than surgical intervention in the short and medium term, and appear to have the same outcomes at 24 months. With abscess confirmed by CT scan, some evidence and clinical guidelines tentatively support the use of oral or IV antibiotics for smaller abscesses (<5 cm) without systemic inflammation, but percutaneous or laparoscopic drainage may be necessary for larger abscesses (>5 cm).

Rifaximin was found in a meta-analysis to give symptom relief and reduce complications but the scientific quality of the underlying studies has been questioned.

==== Mesalamine ====
Mesalamine is an anti-inflammatory medication used in the treatment of inflammatory bowel diseases. In limited studies, patients with diverticulitis and symptomatic diverticular disease treated with mesalamine have shown improvement in both conditions. Mesalazine may reduce recurrences in symptomatic uncomplicated diverticular disease. In 2022, Germany introduced guidance to use mesalamine to treat acute uncomplicated diverticulitis.

=== Surgery ===
Indications for surgery are abscess or fistula formation; and intestinal rupture with peritonitis. These, however, rarely occur.

Emergency surgery is required for peritonitis with perforated diverticulitis or intestinal rupture.

Surgery for an abscess or fistula is indicated either urgently or electively. The timing of the elective surgery is determined by evaluating factors such as the stage of the disease, the age of the person, their general medical condition, the severity and frequency of the attacks, and whether symptoms persist after the first acute episode. In most cases, elective surgery is indicated when the risks of the surgery are less than the risks of the complications of diverticulitis. Elective surgery is not indicated until at least six weeks after recovery from the acute event.

==== Technique ====
The first surgical approach consists of resection and primary anastomosis. This first stage of surgery is performed on patients that have a well-vascularized, nonedematous, and tension-free bowel. The proximal margin should be an area of the pliable colon without hypertrophy or inflammation. The distal margin should extend to the upper third of the rectum where the taenia coalesces. Not all of the diverticula-bearing colon must be removed, since diverticula proximal to the descending or sigmoid colon are unlikely to result in further symptoms.

==== Approach ====
Diverticulitis surgery consists of a bowel resection with or without colostomy. Either may be done by the traditional laparotomy or by laparoscopic surgery. The traditional bowel resection is made using an open surgical approach, called colectomy. During a colectomy, the patient is placed under general anesthesia. A surgeon performing a colectomy will make a lower midline incision in the abdomen or a lateral lower transverse incision. The diseased section of the large intestine is removed, and then the two healthy ends are sewn or stapled together. A colostomy may be performed when the bowel has to be relieved of its normal digestive work as it heals. A colostomy implies creating a temporary opening of the colon on the skin surface, and the end of the colon is passed through the abdominal wall with a removable bag attached to it. The waste is collected in the bag.

However, most surgeons prefer performing the bowel resection laparoscopically, mainly because postoperative pain is reduced with faster recovery. Laparoscopic surgery is a minimally invasive procedure in which three to four smaller incisions are made in the abdomen or navel. After incisions into the abdomen are made, placement of trocars occurs, which allows a camera and other equipment to enter the peritoneal cavity. The greater omentum is reflected, and the affected section of the bowel is mobilized. Alternately, laparoscopic sigmoid resection (LSR) compared to open sigmoid resection (OSR) showed that LSR is not superior to OSR for acute symptomatic diverticulitis. Furthermore, laparoscopic lavage was as safe as resection for perforated diverticulitis with peritonitis.

==== Maneuvers ====
All colon surgeries involve only three maneuvers that may vary in complexity depending on the region of the bowel and the nature of the disease. The maneuvers are the retraction of the colon, the division of the attachments to the colon, and the dissection of the mesentery. After the resection of the colon, the surgeon normally divides the attachments to the liver and the small intestine. After the mesenteric vessels are dissected, the colon is divided with special surgical staplers that close off the bowel while cutting between the staple lines. After resection of the affected bowel segment, an anvil and spike are used to anastomose the remaining segments of the bowel. Anastomosis is confirmed by filling the cavity with normal saline and checking for any air bubbles.

==== Bowel resection with colostomy ====
When excessive inflammation of the colon renders primary bowel resection too risky, bowel resection with colostomy remains an option. Also known as the Hartmann's operation, this is a more complicated surgery typically reserved for life-threatening cases. The bowel resection with colostomy implies a temporary colostomy, which is followed by a second operation to reverse the colostomy. The surgeon makes an opening in the abdominal wall (a colostomy), which helps clear the infection and inflammation. The colon is brought through the opening, and all waste is collected in an external bag.

The colostomy is usually temporary, but it may be permanent, depending on the severity of the case. In most cases, several months later, after the inflammation has healed, the patient undergoes another major surgery, during which the surgeon rejoins the colon and rectum and reverses the colostomy.

=== Prophylactic endoscopic clipping ===
Prophylactic endoscopic clipping is being researched for diverticulitis.

== Epidemiology ==
Diverticulitis most often affects the elderly. In Western countries, diverticular disease most commonly involves the sigmoid colon (95 percent of people with diverticulitis). Diverticulosis affects 5–45% of individuals with the prevalence of diverticulosis increasing with age from under 20% of individuals affected at age 40 up to 60% of individuals affected by age 60.

Left-sided diverticular disease (involving the sigmoid colon) is most common in the West. Right-sided diverticular disease (involving the ascending colon) is more common in Asia and Africa. Among people with diverticulosis, 4–15% may go on to develop diverticulitis.
