= Annals of Surgery =

- Discipline: Surgery
- Language: English
- Edited by: Keith D. Lillemoe

Publication details
- History: 1885–present
- Publisher: Lippincott Williams & Wilkins (United States, United Kingdom)
- Frequency: Monthly
- Impact factor: 6.5 (2024)

Standard abbreviations
- ISO 4: Ann. Surg.

Indexing
- ISSN: 0003-4932 (print); 1528-1140 (web)

The Annals of Surgery is a monthly peer-reviewed medical journal of surgical science and practice. It was started in 1885 by Lippincott Williams & Wilkins (United States, United Kingdom).

== See also ==
- List of medical journals
