= Phemister graft =

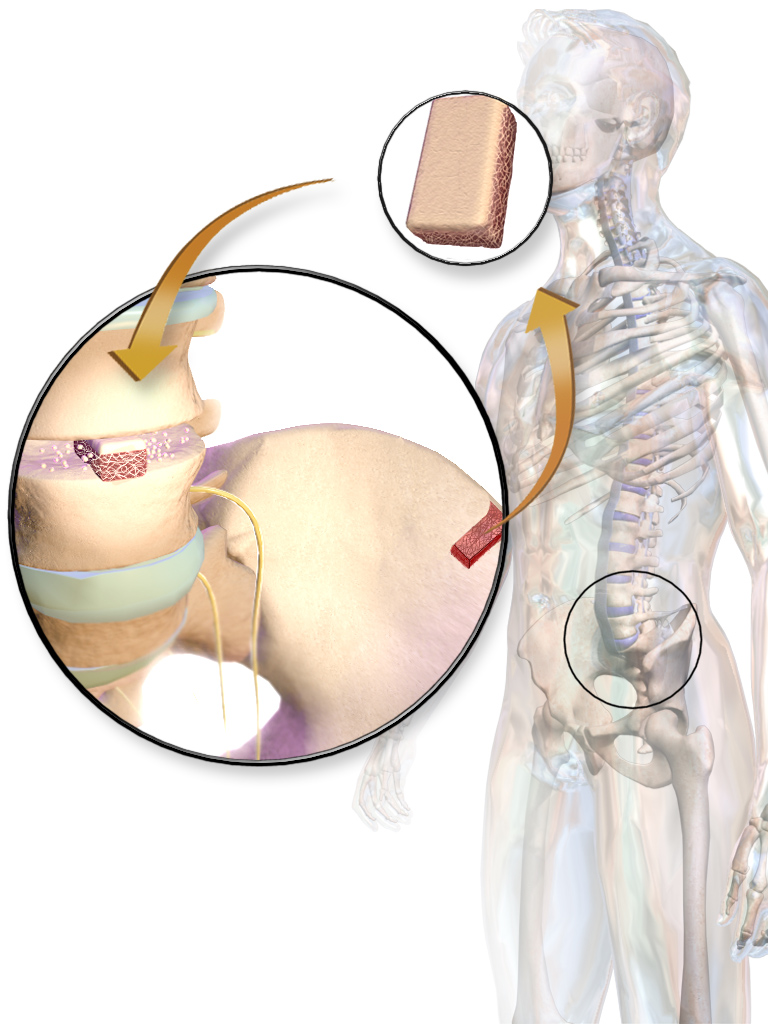
- Illustration of an autograft harvested from iliac crest
- Specialty: Orthopedic surgery

A Phemister graft is a type of bone graft which uses bone tissue harvested from the patient to treat slow-healing, or delayed union bone fractures. Thus, it is a form of autotransplantation. Typically, the tissue used in the graft is cancellous bone harvested from the patient's Iliac crest and laid in strips across the fracture site. The use of the patient's living bone stimulates osteogenesis, the growth of bones.

The Phemister graft was first described in a paper published in 1914 by American surgeon Dallas B. Phemister, and it was named for him. Its efficacy was confirmed the same year by Canadian surgeons William Gallie and D.E. Robertson. In 1949, Phemister described a variation on the technique where the graft tissue was inserted into the base of the greater trochanter and femoral neck in order to treat osteonecrosis. A 1967 study found the original Phemister graft to be more effective than the cortical sliding graft and cancellous graft for fractures of the tibia.

The Phemister graft is preferred when a fracture demonstrates delayed union, meaning the fracture is slow to heal. Due to internal forces, the procedure is not recommended for the femur, humerus, or radius bones. It can be used for areas of bone which have undergone the first two stages of osteonecrosis. For example, in young patients, or those with sickle cell disease, it can serve as an effective long-term treatment for osteonecrosis, as long as it is performed in the early stages. In this instances, it is a more conservative treatment, and in the long term can postpone the need for a hip replacement. In the later stages of osteonecrosis (3 through 6), where the bone has begun to collapse or has fully collapsed, the Phemister graft is not recommended.
