= Henri Albert Hartmann =

French surgeon (1860–1952)

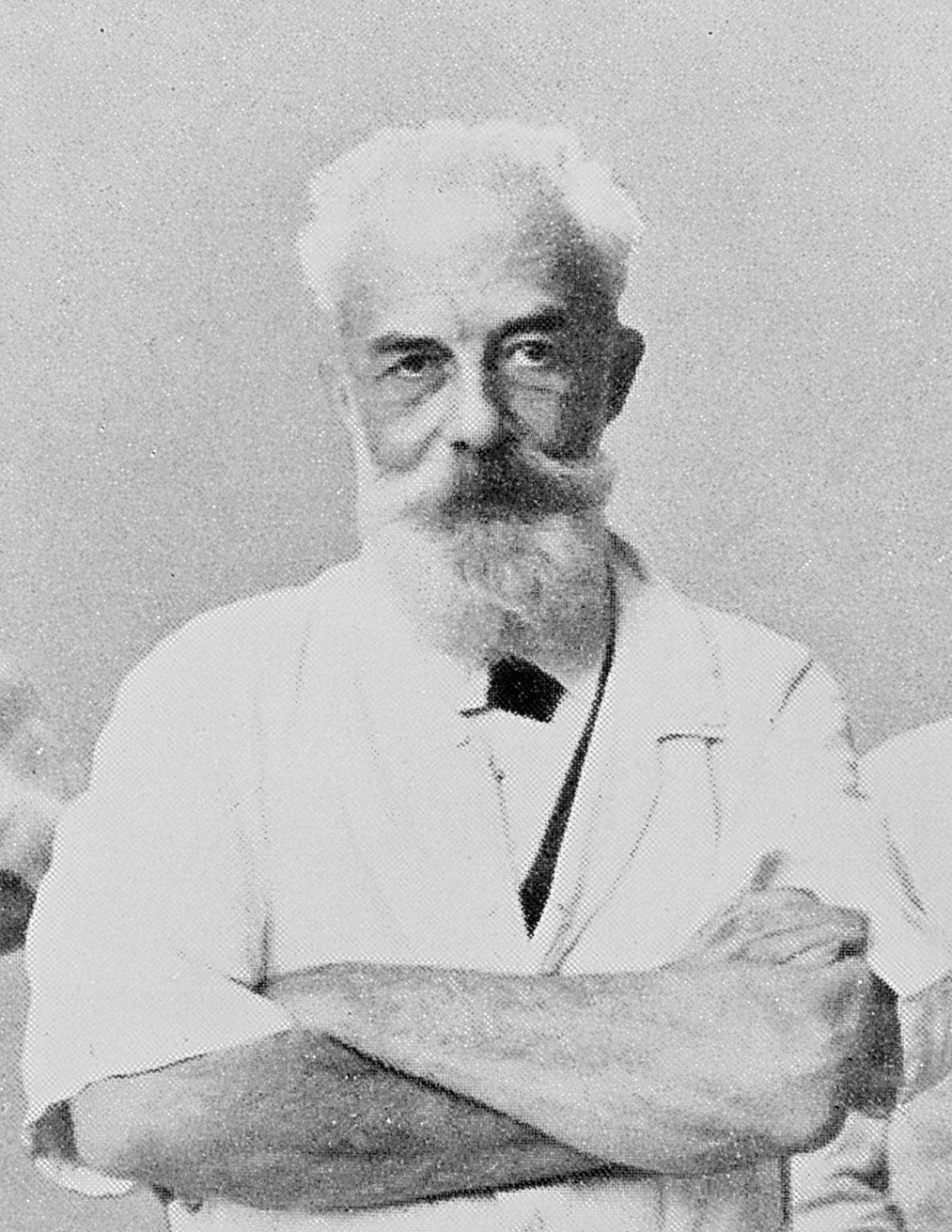
Henri Hartmann in 1920

Henri Albert Hartmann (16 June 1860 – 1 January 1952) was a French surgeon. He wrote numerous papers on a wide variety of subjects, ranging from war injuries to shoulder dislocations to gastrointestinal cancer. Hartmann is best known for Hartmann's operation, a two-stage colectomy he devised for colon cancer and diverticulitis.

== Hartmann Day ==
Hartmann Day is the 16 June, each year. "Hartmann Day" celebrates Henri Albert Charles Antoine Hartmann's (born 16 June 1860) invention of the surgical operation that is now known as the "Hartmann Procedure" that has saved many lives. It also celebrates the work of those who have performed the operation, and of those who have supported patients about to have, having, or have had the operation.

This celebration was instituted in 2021, marking one hundred years since the publication of the operation.

== See also ==
- Hartmann's critical point
- Hartmann's mosquito forceps
- Hartmann's operation
- Hartmann’s pouch
