= Whonamedit? =

Online dictionary of medical eponyms

Whonamedit? was an online English-language dictionary of medical eponyms and the people associated with their identification. Though it was a dictionary, many eponyms and persons are presented in extensive articles with comprehensive bibliographies. The dictionary was hosted in Norway, and was developed by medical historian Ole Daniel Enersen.

As of June 2025, the Whonamedit website has gone offline. The site remains accessible through the Internet Archive.
