= List of eponymous tests =

Eponymous tests are generally named after the person who first described the test.

Letter	Test	Name	Description
A	Abel	Frederick Abel	Used to determine the flash point of a given sample of petroleum in order to ascertain the temperature at which it could safely be used
A	Allen's	Edgar Van Nuys Allen	Used to assess the quality of arterial blood flow to the hand before arterial blood sampling or some surgeries
A	Apgar	Virginia Apgar	Used to quickly assess the health of a newborn infant
A	Apley	Alan Graham Apley	Used to evaluate people for problems in the meniscus of the knee
A	Apt	Leonard Apt	Used in newborns with blood in the stool to distinguish between swallowed maternal blood and neonatal gastrointestinal bleeding
B	Bechdel, Bechdel-Wallace	Alison Bechdel, Liz Wallace	Used as an indicator for the active presence of women in films and other fiction, and to call attention to gender inequality in fiction
D	Duess	Louisa Düss	Projective test for young children.
E	Ebert	Roger Ebert	Used to find out whether a computer-based synthesized voice can tell a joke with sufficient skill to cause people to laugh.
F	Flesch–Kincaid	Rudolf Flesch, J. Peter Kincaid	Used to measure how difficult it is to understand a piece of text written in English.
G	Gilman	Henry Gilman	Detection of Grignard reagents and organolithium reagents
H	Holtzman Inkblot	Wayne H. Holtzman	Projective personality test similar to the Rorschach, aimed at detecting personality.
I	Ishihara	Shinobu Ishihara	Color perception test for red-green color deficiencies
M	Miller	Marvin Miller	Used by the United States Supreme Court for determining whether speech or expression can be labeled obscene, in which case it is not protected by the First Amendment to the United States Constitution and can be prohibited.
M	Myers–Briggs	Isabel Briggs Myers, Katharine Cook Briggs	Used to identify psychological types from a Jungian perspective.
P	Parks–Bielschowsky also known as the Park's three-step test or the Bielschowsky head tilt test	Marshall M. Parks, Alfred Bielschowsky	Used to test for palsy of the superior oblique muscle.
R	Rorschach	Hermann Rorschach	Used to examine a person's personality characteristics and emotional functioning.
S	Scoville Organoleptic	Wilbur Scoville	Measure the pungency (spiciness or "heat") of chili peppers, as recorded in Scoville Heat Units (SHU), based on the concentration of capsaicinoids, among which capsaicin is the predominant component.
S	Szondi	Léopold Szondi	Used to analyze personalities.
T	Turing	Alan Turing	Used to test a machine's ability to exhibit intelligent behavior equivalent to, or indistinguishable from, that of a human.

== See also ==
- List of eponymously named medical signs
