= Evelyn Hooker =

American psychologist (1907–1996)

- Born: Evelyn Gentry; September 2, 1907; North Platte, Nebraska, U.S.
- Died: November 18, 1996 (aged 89); Santa Monica, California, U.S.
- Resting place: Woodlawn Cemetery, Santa Monica, California
- Education: University of Colorado; Johns Hopkins University
- Occupation: Psychologist

Evelyn Hooker (/ˈɛvəliːn ˈhʊkər/; née Gentry, September 2, 1907 – November 18, 1996) was an American psychologist known for her 1956 paper "The Adjustment of the Male Overt Homosexual" in which she administered several psychological tests to groups of self-identified male homosexuals and heterosexuals and asked experts to identify the homosexuals and rate their mental health. The experiment, which other researchers subsequently repeated, found that homosexuality was not a mental disorder, as there was no detectable difference between homosexual and heterosexual men in terms of mental adjustment.

Hooker argued that a false correlation between homosexuality and mental illness had formed the basis of classifying homosexuality as a mental disorder. The correlation was the result of earlier researchers studying sample groups that contained homosexual men with a history of treatment for mental illness. Hooker's work was of critical importance in refuting cultural heterosexism because it found that homosexuality was not developmentally inferior to heterosexuality. Her work led the way to the eventual removal of homosexuality from the American Psychiatric Association's Diagnostic and Statistical Manual of Mental Disorders.

== Life ==
Hooker was born Evelyn Gentry in North Platte, Nebraska, in her grandmother's house and grew up with eight brothers and sisters in the Colorado Plains. When she was 13, her family moved to Sterling, Colorado. The journey to Sterling would be one of Hooker's fondest memories.

Hooker's mother, Jessie Bethel, who had a third grade education, told her to pursue an education because that was the only thing that could not be taken away from her. The Gentry family was not wealthy, and Hooker was stigmatized by her nearly 6-foot (1.8 m) stature. Jessie Bethel enrolled her daughter at Sterling High School, which was large and unusually progressive for the time. There, Hooker entered an honors program and was able to take a course in psychology. Hooker desired to attend a teachers college, but her instructors saw her potential and encouraged her to go to the University of Colorado. By the time she was ready to graduate, she had obtained a scholarship to the University of Colorado Boulder (UCB).

In 1924, she matriculated at UCB while working as a maid for a rich Boulder family. Her mentor, Karl Munzinger, guided her to challenge the then-prevalent psychological theory of behaviourism. She wrote her thesis on trial-and-error learning in rats. Munzinger invited her to record her own case history. After receiving her master's degree, she became one of 11 women enrolled in the PhD program in psychology at Johns Hopkins University, Baltimore, Maryland, having been refused entry by the chairman of Yale for being a female. She studied with Knight Dunlap, who also generally did not approve of women doctorates. She was awarded her PhD in 1932.

In her early career, she was not especially interested in the psychology of homosexual people. After teaching for only one year at the Maryland College for Women, she contracted tuberculosis and spent the next year in a sanatorium in Arizona. After recovery she began teaching at Whittier College in southern California. Then, in 1937, Gentry received a fellowship to the Berlin Institute of Psychotherapy, at which point she left Whittier. Hooker lived with a Jewish family while she studied in Europe. While there, she got a first-hand look at the rise of Adolf Hitler and witnessed such events as the Kristallnacht. She learned later that the Jewish family she lived with was killed in concentration camps. Before returning home, Hooker went on a group tour to Russia, arriving just after a major purge. The events that Hooker would see in Europe ultimately sparked her desire to help overcome social injustice.

When Hooker was ready to return to work at Whittier, she was prevented from returning. The leadership at Whittier was suspicious of her year living in totalitarian Europe. She and several other staff were let go because they were suspected of subversive behavior. She subsequently applied to the psychology department at the University of California, Los Angeles (UCLA). The chair of the department at UCLA was then Knight Dunlap, Hooker's mentor from Johns Hopkins. Dunlap said he desired to offer her a job, but they already had three female faculty members and they were “cordially disliked”. She was able to secure a position as a research associate, however. Hooker quickly gained a reputation as a brilliant teacher and researcher. She stayed at UCLA for 31 years, where she conducted research and taught experimental and physiological psychology until 1970 when she went into private practice.

During the 1940s, she became interested in what would turn out to be her life's work. Hooker was teaching an introductory psychology class in 1944 when a student approached her after class. He identified himself as Sam From; he confided in her that he was gay and so were most of his friends. She realized that From was one of the brightest students in the class and quickly became friends with him. They would spend time between and after classes to talk and become acquainted. Sam From introduced Hooker to his circle of homosexual friends. They would go to clubs, bars, and parties where Hooker was able to fraternize with more homosexuals. From's closest friends included Christopher Isherwood and Stephen Spender, a writer and a poet. He challenged her to scientifically study "people like him".

From proposed a question to Hooker: Why not conduct research on homosexuals to determine whether homosexuality was some sort of disease or disorder and not relevant to a person's psychological makeup? He urged her to conduct research on homosexuals, saying it was "her scientific duty to study people like us". Hooker was intrigued by the question and further persuaded by her experience with social rejection as a child, witnessing the effects of racial and political persecution in her travels, and discrimination in her professional life.

Over the next two decades, she became established professionally. In 1948, she moved to a guest cottage at the Salter [or Saltair] Avenue home of Edward Hooker, professor of English at UCLA and a poetry scholar. They married in London in 1951, and she took his surname. In the mid-fifties, Christopher Isherwood became their neighbor. She opposed the relationship of Isherwood with the much younger Don Bachardy; they were not welcome at her house. Sam From died in a car accident in 1956, just before Hooker's ground-breaking research was published. Hooker's husband died in January 1957 of cardiac arrest.

The 1960s saw her work find a wider audience, and her conclusions were adopted by the gay rights movement. In 1961, Hooker was invited to lecture in Europe and in 1967, the director of the National Institute of Mental Health (NIMH) asked her to produce a report on how the institute should treat homosexual men. Richard Nixon's election in 1969 delayed the publication of the report, which was published by a magazine, without authorization, in 1970. The report recommended the decriminalization of homosexuality and the provision of similar rights to both homosexual and heterosexual people. The burgeoning gay rights movement seized on this.

Hooker retired from UCLA in 1970 at the age of 63 and started a private practice in Santa Monica. Most of her clients were gay men and lesbians. In later life she would be awarded the Distinguished Contribution in the Public Interest Award. The University of Chicago opened the Evelyn Hooker Center for Gay and Lesbian Studies in her honor. She was the subject of the 1992 Academy Award–nominated film Changing Our Minds: The Story of Dr. Evelyn Hooker.

Hooker died at her home in Santa Monica, California, in 1996, at the age of 89.

== Projective tests study ==
Although Hooker had collected data about her homosexual friends since 1954, she felt this was of little value because of the lack of scientific rigor attached to the gathering of these data. She applied for a grant from the NIMH even though she was warned that it was highly unlikely she would receive it due to the controversy of the topic. After all, the 1950s was at the height of the McCarthy era, and homosexuality was considered to be a mental disorder by psychologists, a sin by the church, and a crime by the law. The man in charge of awarding the grants, John Eberhart, personally met with Hooker and, convinced by her charm, he awarded her the grant.

She gathered two groups of men: one group would be exclusively homosexual, the other exclusively heterosexual. She contacted the Mattachine Society to find a large portion of homosexual men. The Mattachine Society was an organization whose purpose was to integrate homosexuals into society. She had greater difficulty finding heterosexual men for the study. She gathered a sample of 30 heterosexual men and 30 homosexual men and paired them based on equivalent IQ, age, and education. For the interest of the study, it was required that none of the men from either group have previously been seen for psychological help, in disciplinary barracks in the armed services, in prison, showed evidence of considerable disturbance, or who were in therapy. She also had to use her home to conduct the interviews to protect the participants' anonymity.

Hooker used three projective psychological tests for her study: the Thematic Apperception Test (TAT), the Make-a-Picture-Story test (MAPS test), and the Rorschach inkblot test. The Rorschach was used due to the belief of clinicians at the time that it was the best method for diagnosing homosexuality.

After a year of work, Hooker presented a team of three expert evaluators with 60 unmarked psychological profiles. She decided to leave the interpretation of her results to other people, to avoid any possible bias.

First, she contacted Bruno Klopfer, an expert on Rorschach tests, to see if he would be able to identify the sexual orientation of people through their results at those tests. His ability to differentiate between the two groups was no better than chance. Then Edwin Shneidman, creator of the MAPS test, also analyzed the 60 profiles. It took him six months and he, too, found that both groups were highly similar in their psychological make-up. The third expert was Dr. Mortimer Mayer, who was so certain he would be able to tell the two groups apart that he went through the process twice.

The assumption was that these tests would prompt respondents to reveal their innermost anxieties, fears, and wishes. Each test response would be submitted in random order, with no identifying information, to Klopfer, Meyer, and Shneidman. The judges had two tasks: to arrive at an overall adjustment rating on a five-point scale, and to distinguish in pairs which participant was homosexual and heterosexual. The three evaluators concluded that in terms of adjustment, there were no differences between the members of each group.

In 1956, Hooker presented the results of her research in a paper at the American Psychological Association's convention in Chicago. The NIMH was so impressed with the evidence Hooker found they granted her the NIMH Research Career Award in 1961 to continue her work.

Her studies contributed to a change in the attitudes of the psychological community toward homosexuality and to the American Psychiatric Association's decision to remove homosexuality from its handbook of disorders in 1973. This in turn helped change the attitude of society at large. One element that did stay in the handbook of disorders was ego-dystonic homosexuality. Experts became concerned about using psychoanalytic approaches and behavior modification conversion therapy. In 1987, ego-dystonic homosexuality was also eliminated from the handbook when it was determined that psychological therapies could not "cure" homosexuality, since there was nothing to remedy or treat.

== Publications ==
- Evelyn Hooker, "The adjustment of the male overt homosexual", Journal of projective techniques, XXI 1956, pp. 18–31.
- Evelyn Hooker, "The homosexual community". Proceedings of the XIV International congress of applied psychology, Munksgaard, Copenhagen 1961.
- Evelyn Hooker, "Homosexuality: Summary of studies". In Evelyn Duvall and Sylvanus Duvall (curr.), Sex ways in fact and faith, Association Press, New York 1961.
- Evelyn Hooker, "Male homosexual life styles and venereal disease". In: Proceedings of the World forum on syphilis and other treponematoses (Public Health Service Publication No. 997), U.S. Government Printing Office, Washington, DC 1962.
- Evelyn Hooker, "Male homosexuality". In: N. L. Farberow (cur.), Taboo topics, Atherton, New York 1963, pp. 44–55.
- Evelyn Hooker, "An empirical study of some relations between sexual patterns and gender identity in male homosexuals". In J. Money (cur.), Sex research: new development, Holt, Rinehart & Winston, New York 1965, pp. 24–52.
- Evelyn Hooker, "Male homosexuals and their worlds". In: Judd Marmor (cur.), Sexual inversion: the multiple roots of homosexuality, Basic Books, New York 1965, pp. 83–107). Traduzione italiana in: Judd Marmor, Inversione sessuale.
- Evelyn Hooker, "Homosexuality". In: The international encyclopedia of the social sciences, Macmillan and Free Press, New York 1968.
- Evelyn Hooker, "Parental relations and male homosexuality in patient and non-patient samples", Journal of consulting and clinical psychology, XXXIII 1969, pp. 140–142.
- Evelyn Hooker, Foreword to: C. J. Williams and M. S. Weinberg, Homosexuals and the military: a study of less than honorable discharge, Harper & Row, New York 1971, pp. vii–ix.

== Legacy ==
In 2010, actor/playwright Jade Esteban Estrada portrayed Hooker in the solo musical ICONS: The Lesbian and Gay History of the World, Vol. 4.

Season 1, episode 4 of the podcast Making Gay History is about her.

== Honors and awards ==
- In 1967, Hooker became Chair of the NIMH Task Force on Homosexuality.
- In 1991, she received the Award for Distinguished Contribution to Psychology in the Public Interest presented by the American Psychological Association.
- In 1992, she received The Lifetime Achievement Award, APA's highest honor.
