= Pat =

Pat or PAT may refer to:

== Arts, entertainment and media ==
=== Fictional characters ===
- Pat (Alice's Adventures in Wonderland), a gardener
- Pat (Saturday Night Live), an androgynous character
- Postman Pat, a British children's TV character
- Pat, from the Czech series Pat & Mat
- Pat the Dog, a character from the TV show of the same name
- Pat, or Lucky's Dad, a Bluey character
- Pat, daughter-in-law of Jake the Dog in Adventure Time

=== Other arts, entertainment and media ===
- "Pat" (album), by Pat Boone, 1957
- Red PAT, a Bolivian television channel

== Businesses and organisations ==
- Pakistan Awami Tehreek, a political party
- Pickleball Association Tasmania
- Polish Telegraphic Agency, the official news agency of Poland 1918–1991
- Port Authority of Thailand
- Professional Association of Teachers, later Voice, a former British trade union
- PAT (Ukrainian: Публічне акціонерне товариство), a type of Ukrainian legal entity, equivalent to plc

== People ==
- Patrick (given name), including a list of people with the name, sometimes known as Pat
- Patricia, a feminine given name, including a list of people with the name, sometimes known as Pat
- Narcisse Théophile Patouillard (1854–1926, standard botanical abbreviation: Pat.), French pharmacist and mycologist
- Jenny Pat (1981–2014), Hong Kong-born, Chinese-Canadian international art dealer, visual artist, and television personality
- Naum Pat (fl. 1520s), Maya batab or mayor

== Places ==
- Pat, Hungary
- Pat, Iran
- Pat, Jerusalem
- Pat River, Quebec, Canada
- Port Arthur, Texas, U.S., nickname PAT
- Patince (Hungarian: Pat), a village in Slovakia

== Science and technology ==
=== Computing ===
- PAT (model checker), the Process Analysis Toolkit
- Page attribute table, in x86 and x86-64 memory caching
- Performance acceleration technology, an Intel memory performance technology
- Port address translation, a type of network address translation
- Program Association Table, in an MPEG transport stream
- Personal access token, a password alternative

=== Medicine and biology ===
- Paddington alcohol test, for alcohol-related problems
- Paroxysmal atrial tachycardia, an episode of arrhythmia that begins and ends abruptly
- Peripheral Arterial Tone, a noninvasive measure
- Phosphinothricin acetyltransferase, an enzyme
- Photoacoustic tomography, by an ultrasound scan
- Picture arrangement test, in psychological testing
- Process analytical technology, in pharmaceutical manufacturing
- Pseudotropine acyltransferase, an enzyme
- Putrescine aminotransferase, an enzyme

=== Other science and technology ===
- Photographic Activity Test, an ISO standard test
- Portable appliance testing, an electrical safety test
- Powder-actuated tool, a type of nail gun

== Transportation ==
- Patricroft railway station (station code: PAT), Manchester, England
- Patterson railway station (station code: PAT), Melbourne, Australia
- Port Authority Transit, later Pittsburgh Regional Transit, Pennsylvania, US
- Jay Prakash Narayan Airport (IATA airport code: PAT), Patna, India

== Other uses ==
- Point after touchdown, in American football
- Pat silk, a variety of silk
- Prodotti agroalimentari tradizionali, an official approval for traditional Italian regional food products
- Pat hand, in the card game of poker

== See also ==
- Patricia (disambiguation)
- Patrick (disambiguation)
- PATS (disambiguation)
- Patt (disambiguation)
- Expatriate, or ex-pat, a person residing in a country other than their native country
- I = PAT, the impact of human activity on the environment
