= PAT Test (disambiguation) =

PAT Test is an electrical safety test.

PAT Test may also refer to:

- Photographic Activity Test, an ISO standard test
- Paddington alcohol test, for alcohol-related problems
- Picture arrangement test

== See also ==
- PAT (disambiguation)
