= YDC =

YDC may refer to:

- Youth detention center, a type of prison for people under the age of majority
- Yousuf Dewan Companies, a conglomerate company based in Karachi, Pakistan
- Yali Dream Creations, an Indian comic books publisher
- Youkon Distributed Caching, the Microsoft internal name for space-based architecture, a distributed computing concept
- YDC, the IATA code for Drayton Valley Industrial Airport, Alberta, Canada

== See also ==
- CYDC, the ICAO code for Princeton Aerodrome in British Columbia, Canada
- YdcW, two enzymes
