= Spermidine dehydrogenase =

Identifiers
- EC no.: 1.5.99.6
- CAS no.: 9076-64-6

Databases
- BRENDA: enzyme data
- ExPASy: NiceZyme view
- KEGG: enzyme entry
- MetaCyc: metabolic pathway
- Rhea: reactions
- PDB structures: RCSB PDB PDBe PDBsum
- Gene Ontology: AmiGO / QuickGO
Search
- PMC: articles
- PubMed: articles
- NCBI: proteins

Spermidine dehydrogenase (EC 1.5.99.6) is an enzyme that catalyzes the chemical reaction

Spermidine
+ electron
acceptor
H_{2}O
H_{2}O
1,3-Diaminopropane
+ reduced
acceptor
+
4-Aminobutanal

The three substrates of this enzyme are spermidine, an electron acceptor, and water. Its products are 1,3-diaminopropane, 4-aminobutanal, and the correcponding reduced acceptor.

This enzyme belongs to the family of oxidoreductases, specifically those acting on the CH-NH group of donor with other acceptors. The systematic name of this enzyme class is spermidine:acceptor oxidoreductase. This enzyme is also called spermidine:(acceptor) oxidoreductase. This enzyme participates in urea cycle and metabolism of amino groups and beta-alanine metabolism. It has 2 cofactors: flavin adenine dinucleotide, and heme.
