= KFD =

KFD may refer to:

- Karnataka Forum for Dignity
- Kill Fuck Die or K.F.D. - 1998 studio album by American metal band W.A.S.P.
- Kinetic family drawing
- Knoxville Fire Department
- Kyasanur forest disease
- Kitchener Fire Department
- Kikuchi-Fujimoto disease
