= Identification Projection Series =

Identification Projection Series (IPS) refers to a projective technique used in psychotherapy. IPS is related to other, more established, projective methods in psychotherapy such as the Rorschach Test and the Thematic Apperception Test (TAT). A more recent projective method with a higher degree of validity is the Adult Attachment Projective Picture System (AAP). IPS is based on two sets of 40 pictures based on paintings or photographs. One set contains various stages and possibilities of male and the other the female socialization.

== Purpose ==
IPS is used to elicit emotional responses from a client. According to the principles of IPS, art is particularly well-suited to elicit strong responses from a client because the works of art contain the psychological energies of the artist, which can be reproduced by the client through empathy. Another purpose of IPS is to increase the client's awareness of recurring themes throughout his or her biography.

The IPS pictures can further assume a catalytic function during therapy. The pictures elicit emotional or physical responses, associations, set in motion thought processes and may trigger identification, projection or other defense mechanisms. The interpretation of the client's responses is aimed at the integration of previously unvoiced subjects and themes into therapy.

== Administration ==
The client is given the 40 cards and asked to sort them into two stacks: “meaningful” and “not meaningful”, according to the client's emotional and physical responses. The client is asked to review the pictures one by one. He is asked to focus on changes in mood or emotions during the viewing process. Pictures that elicit physical or emotional reactions or elicit a memory are placed onto the “meaningful” stack.

The subset of “meaningful” picture is distributed into new categories: according to the current state in the therapeutic process, these can be: “past”, “present”, and “future”; “inside” and “outside”; “dreams” or “therapy session”. Basics for interpretation of results:

A written protocol is required to interpret the responses. The following elements are protocolled:

- client's utterances regarding image content
- viewing duration (from picking up until categorizing the picture)
- duration of pondering upon the picture
- additional variables: change in breathing pattern, voice, eye movement, skin color, facial expression, gestures

There has been no reliable psychometric data collection and evaluation for IPS. The qualitative analysis of the client's verbal responses can be conducted with the evaluation scheme by Lester Luborsky, Kurt Lewin or David McClelland. The analysis aims to make inferences of recurring themes in the client's biography and personality traits.

== See also ==
- Selective perception
- Projective test
- Qualitative research
- Grounded theory
