= Lövheim Cube of Emotions =

Model of emotion

Lövheim cube of emotion

Lövheim Cube of Emotion is a theoretical model for the relationship between the monoamine neurotransmitters serotonin, dopamine and noradrenaline and emotions. The model was presented in 2012 by Swedish researcher Hugo Lövheim.

== Overview ==
Lövheim classifies emotions according to Silvan Tomkins, and orders the basic emotions in a three-dimensional coordinate system where the level of the monoamine neurotransmitters form orthogonal axes. The model is regarded as a dimensional model of emotion.

== Concepts ==
The main concepts of the hypothesis are firstly that the monoamine neurotransmitters are orthogonal variables, meaning involving independent pairs of neurotransmitters; and secondly the proposed one-to-one relationship between the monoamine neurotransmitters and emotions.
