= Putrescine aminotransferase =

Enzyme

Identifiers
- EC no.: 2.6.1.82
- CAS no.: 98982-73-

Databases
- IntEnz: IntEnz view
- BRENDA: BRENDA entry
- ExPASy: NiceZyme view
- KEGG: KEGG entry
- MetaCyc: metabolic pathway
- PRIAM: profile
- PDB structures: RCSB PDB PDBe PDBsum
Search
- PMC: articles
- PubMed: articles
- NCBI: proteins

Putrescine aminotransferase (EC 2.6.1.82, putrescine-alpha-ketoglutarate transaminase, YgjG, putrescine:alpha-ketoglutarate aminotransferase, PAT, putrescine:2-oxoglutarate aminotransferase, putrescine transaminase) is an enzyme with systematic name butane-1,4-diamine:2-oxoglutarate aminotransferase. This pyridoxal phosphate-dependent enzyme catalyses the following chemical reaction

putrescine
+
α-ketoglutaric acid
4-aminobutanal
+
L-glutamic acid

The two substrates of this enzyme first characterised Escherichia coli are putrescine and α-ketoglutaric acid. Its initial products are 4-aminobutanal and L-glutamic acid. In this bacterium, the reaction is part of the breakdown pathway of the amino acid arginine.

4-aminobutanal is unstable under these reaction conditions as its aldehyde functional group can cyclise readily with the amino group, losing water:

4-aminobutanal
H_{2}O
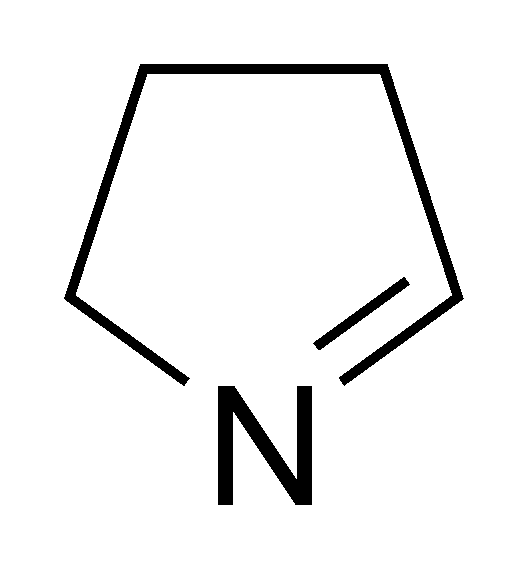
1-pyrroline

4-aminobutanal or 1-pyrroline are the starting substrates for the next enzyme in the pathway, aminobutyraldehyde dehydrogenase.
