= PATS =

Pats, Päts or PATS may refer to:

== Sports teams ==
- New England Patriots, a National Football League team based in the Greater Boston area, United States
- St Patrick's Athletic F.C., an Irish association football club based in the Dublin suburb of Inchicore
- Montreal Pats, senior and junior ice hockey teams in Montreal, Quebec, Canada (1941–1942)
- Regina Pats, a junior hockey team based in Regina, Saskatchewan, Canada

== People ==
- Konstantin Päts (1874–1956), politician of interwar Estonia
- Pats Acholonu (1936–2006), Justice of the Supreme Court of Nigeria

== Acronym ==
- SecuriLock, Passive Anti-Theft System (PATS), an engine immobilization system developed by Ford
- Performance Analysis of Telecommunication Systems, a research group at the Department of Mathematics and Computer Science of the University of Antwerp
- Publicly Available Telephone Services
- RTMC Astronomy Expo, Pacific Astronomy and Telescope Show (PATS) that was held annually 2008–2012 in Pasadena, California

== Other uses ==
- Pats Lake, Idaho, United States

== See also ==
- Pat (disambiguation)
