= Holtzman Inkblot Technique =

Projective personality test

- From Holtzman's original 1961 "Inkblot Perception and Personality" book showing an inkblot and pointing out different areas. The text provides some example interpretations and how these are scored.
- MeSH: D006698

The Holtzman Inkblot Technique (HIT), also known as the Holtzman Inkblot Test, is a projective psychological test in which subjects' perceptions of inkblots are recorded and then analyzed using psychological interpretation. Initially conceived by Wayne H. Holtzman and colleagues, it was first developed in 1961 in an attempt to address several controversies surrounding the Rorschach at the time, notably the confusion arising from the two philosophies regarding the test: one treating it as a projective technique, and the other treating it as a psychometric device. Holtzman opted for the later in his technique, relying on reliable scores over flexible interpretations. It largely faded into obscurity following the release of John E. Exner's Comprehensive System.

== History ==
Holtzman inkblots interpretation are graded according to a number of pre-defined criteria.

The Holtzman Inkblot Test (HIT) was invented as an attempt to address some issues surrounding the Rorschach Inkblot Test. The HIT was used to assess the personal structure of the subject.

== Method ==
During administration of the test, the testee will be presented with one of two sets of cards, each containing forty-five unique cards, and two "test" cards that are identical in each set that are presented as practice during the beginning of the test. The two sets of cards exist as parallel series designed to solve the retestability limitation of the Rorschach.

The inkblot series has also been used in combination with Robert R. Holt's scoring system for the Rorschach.

=== Scoring ===
The scoring includes 22 variables covering the aspects of the patient's response to the inkblot. Many different variables apply when scoring.

No.	Variable	Abbrev.	Description
1	Reaction Time	(RT)	the time in seconds from the presentation of the inkblot to the beginning of the first response
2	Rejection	(R)	score 1 when subject returns inkblot to examiner without giving a scorable response; otherwise score 0
3	Location	(L)	tendency to break down blot into smaller fragments. score 0=use of whole blot, 1=large area, 2=smaller area
4	Space	(S)	score 1=true figure-ground reversals; score 0 otherwise
5	Form Definiteness	(FD)	the definiteness of the form of the concept reported, regardless of the goodness of fit to the inkblot. a 5-point scale with 0=very vague and 4=very specific
6	Form Appropriateness	(FA)	the goodness of fit of the form of the percept to the form of the inkblot. Score 0=poor 1=fair, 2=good
7	Color	(C)	the apparent primacy of color, including black, gray and white, as a response-determinant. score 0=no use of color, 1=secondary to form, 2=primary determinant with some form present, 3=primary determinant
8	Shading	(Sh)	the apparent primacy of shading as response determinant. 0=no use of shading, 1=secondary to form, 2=used as primary determinant but some form is present, 3= primary determinant
9	Movement	(M)	the energy level of movement or potential movement ascribed to the percept, regardless of content. 0=none, 1=static potential, 2=casual, 3=dynamic, 4=violent movement
10	Pathognomic Verbalization	(V)	degree of autistic, bizarre thinking evident in the response as rated on a five scale.
11	Integration	(I)	score 1=organization of 2 or more adequately perceived blot elements into a larger whole
12	Human	(H)	degree of human quality in the content of response
13	Animal	(A)	degree of animal quality in the content
14	Anatomy	(At)	degree of "gut-like" quality in the content
15	Sex	(Sx)	degree of sexual quality in the content
16	Abstract	(Ab)	degree of abstract quality in the content
17	Anxiety	(Ax)	degree of anxiety or fantasy content as indicated by emotions and attitudes, expressive behavior, symbolism, or cultural stereotypes of fear.
18	Hostility	(Hs)	signs of hostility or fantasy content
19	Barrier	(Br)	reference to any protective covering, shell, membrane or skin that may be symbolically related to the perception of body image boundaries.
20	Penetration	(Pn)	concept that may be symbolic of an individual's feeling that his body exterior is of little protective value and can be easily penetrated
21	Balance	(B)	overt concern for the symmetry-asymmetry feature of the inkblot.
22	Popular	(P)	percept occurred at least 14% of the time among normal subjects

== Test standardization ==
Holtzman and Swartz (1983) undertook a review of 25 years of research on the standardization of the HIT. They reported that:

22 quantitative variables were developed covering most of the scoring categories and dimensions used with the Rorschach. High reliability coefficients have been reported in a large number of investigations. Although the HIT has been in clinical use for 25 yrs, norms for several important clinical reference groups have been established (e.g., schizophrenics, depressives, delinquents, neurotics, and alcoholics). The 6 factors representing the most important variables have proven useful in clinical applications of the HIT. A large number of studies have confirmed the technique's differential validity, supported by findings from longitudinal, cross-sectional, and cross-cultural investigations. Several hundred studies have been published on the relationships between HIT variables and other measures of personality. Still other investigations of external validity have been conducted using physiological and behavioral measures as well as personality questionnaires. Results from studies using the German version of the HIT are summarized and recent advances with the HIT are discussed.

== See also ==
- Pareidolia
- Picture Arrangement Test
- Projective test
- Thematic Apperception Test
- Blacky Pictures Test
