= ALDH9A1 =

Protein found in humans

Identifiers
- Aliases: ALDH9A1, ALDH4, ALDH7, ALDH9, E3, TMABADH, aldehyde dehydrogenase 9 family member A1, TMABA-DH, TMABALDH
- External IDs: OMIM: 602733; MGI: 1861622; GeneCards: ALDH9A1
Enzyme activity
EC #	BRENDA	ExPASy	KEGG	MetaCyc
1.2.1.3	↗	↗	↗	↗
1.2.1.19	↗	↗	↗	↗
1.2.1.46	↗	↗	↗	↗
1.2.1.47	↗	↗	↗	↗

Gene location (Human)
Chr.	Chromosome 1 (human)
Band	1q24.1	Start	165,662,216 bp
Band	1q24.1	End	165,698,562 bp

Gene location (Mouse)
Chr.	Chromosome 1 (mouse)
Band	1|1 H2.3	Start	167,177,560 bp
Band	1|1 H2.3	End	167,196,101 bp
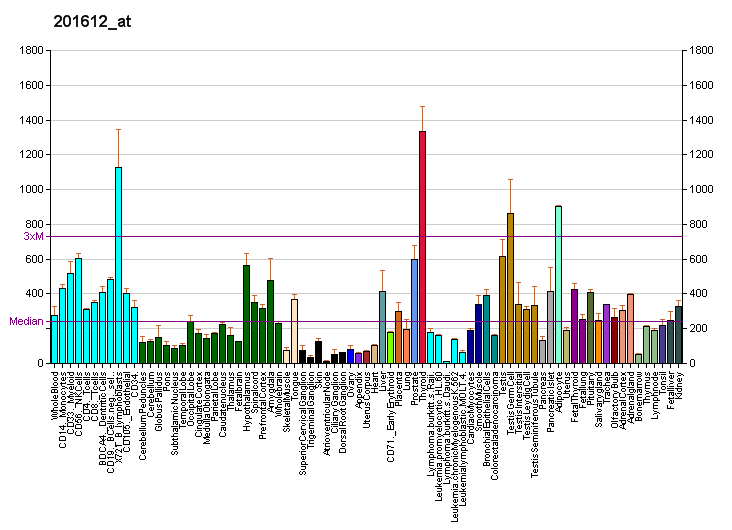
RNA expression pattern
Bgee	Human / Mouse (ortholog); Top expressed in: right adrenal cortex; left adrenal gland; left adrenal cortex; salivary gland; minor salivary glands; mucosa of esophagus; left lobe of thyroid gland; right lobe of thyroid gland; liver; corpus callosum / Top expressed in: left lobe of liver; retinal pigment epithelium; Paneth cell; crypt of lieberkuhn of small intestine; human kidney; migratory enteric neural crest cell; ciliary body; jejunum; ileum; decidua; More reference expression data
BioGPS	More reference expression data
Gene ontology
Molecular function	aldehyde dehydrogenase (NAD+) activity; oxidoreductase activity; aminobutyraldehyde dehydrogenase activity; 1-pyrroline dehydrogenase activity; 4-trimethylammoniobutyraldehyde dehydrogenase activity; 3-chloroallyl aldehyde dehydrogenase activity; oxidoreductase activity, acting on the aldehyde or oxo group of donors, NAD or NADP as acceptor; glyceraldehyde-3-phosphate dehydrogenase (NAD+) (non-phosphorylating) activity
Cellular component	cytoplasm; extracellular exosome; cytosol
Biological process	cellular aldehyde metabolic process; hormone metabolic process; metabolism; neurotransmitter biosynthetic process; carnitine biosynthetic process
Sources:Amigo / QuickGO
Orthologs
Databases	NCBI: entry; OMA: entry
Species	Human	Mouse
Entrez	223	56752
Ensembl	ENSG00000143149	ENSMUSG00000026687
UniProt	P49189	Q9JLJ2
RefSeq (mRNA)	NM_000696; NM_001365774	NM_019993
RefSeq (protein)	NP_000687; NP_001352703	NP_064377; NP_001389759; NP_001389768; NP_001389769; NP_001389773 NP_001389774; NP_001389775; NP_001392024
Location (UCSC)	Chr 1: 165.66 – 165.7 Mb	Chr 1: 167.18 – 167.2 Mb
PubMed search
- Wikidata
View/Edit Human	View/Edit Mouse

4-trimethylaminobutyraldehyde dehydrogenase is an enzyme that in humans is encoded by the ALDH9A1 gene.

== Function ==
This protein belongs to the aldehyde dehydrogenase family of proteins. It has a high activity for oxidation of gamma-aminobutyraldehyde (GABAL) and other amino aldehydes. The enzyme catalyzes the dehydrogenation of GABAL to gamma-aminobutyric acid (GABA). This isozyme is a tetramer of identical 54-kD subunits.
