= Silvan Tomkins =

American psychologist (1911–1991)

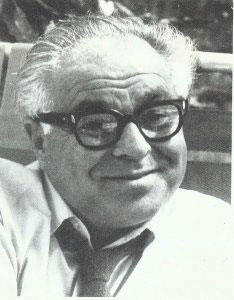
- Born: Silvan Solomon Tomkins; June 4, 1911; Philadelphia, Pennsylvania, U.S.
- Died: June 10, 1991 (aged 80); Somers Point, New Jersey, U.S.
- Education: University of Pennsylvania
- Known for: Affect theory, script theory, queer theory
- Scientific career
- Fields: Psychology, affect theory
- Workplaces: Harvard University; Princeton University; CUNY Graduate Center; Rutgers University

Silvan Solomon Tomkins (June 4, 1911 – June 10, 1991) was an American psychologist and personality theorist who developed both affect theory and script theory. Following the publication of the third volume of his book Affect Imagery Consciousness in 1991, his body of work received renewed interest, leading to attempts by others to summarize and popularize his theories.

== Biography ==
The following is a summary based on a biographical essay by Irving Alexander.

Silvan Tomkins was born in Philadelphia to Russian Jewish immigrants, and raised in Camden, New Jersey. He studied playwriting as an undergraduate at the University of Pennsylvania, but immediately on graduating he enrolled as a graduate student in psychology. However, he withdrew upon completing only the master's degree, finding the Penn Psychology Department's emphasis on psychophysics unfriendly to his interests. Remaining at Penn, he received his PhD in philosophy in 1934, working on value theory with Edgar A. Singer, Jr.

After a year handicapping horse races, he relocated to Harvard for postdoctoral study in Philosophy with W.V. Quine. In time, he became aware of the Harvard Psychological Clinic, and in 1937 he joined its staff, entering a particularly productive and happy period of his life. During this period, he published his first book, Contemporary Psychopathology, containing a survey of contemporary thought as well as his own contribution to it. He wrote a book about the projective Thematic Apperception Test, then developed the Picture Arrangement Test that combined elements of projection and forced choice.

In 1947, he married Elizabeth "BeeGee" Taylor; the marriage would last nearly three decades. The same year, he moved to Princeton University's Department of Psychology to take a position that would entail a large amount of frustration. First, he would work at the Educational Testing Service, which required him to submit documentation of the precise hours he worked in the building. At the same time, he worked for Princeton University, which never fully supported the graduate program in Clinical Psychology which he tried to establish.

During his Princeton career, he was able to spend a year at the Ford Center in Palo Alto, California, where he wrote what became the first two volumes of Affect Imagery Consciousness. At this point in his career, he began to have a mentoring relationship with two younger scholars—Paul Ekman and Carroll Izard—who would later become better known than Tomkins and whose early concepts of emotion owe much to Tomkins'.

After receiving an NIMH career research award, he left Princeton for CUNY Graduate Center in 1965, then in 1968 moved to Rutgers University, from which he retired in 1975 to work on his script theory.

== Tomkins' theoretical constructs ==
The title of Tomkins' four volume work Affect Imagery Consciousness (AIC) is a three-word summary of his entire "Human Being Theory." Affect stands for human motivation: 'why' do humans do what they do? Affect represents "amplified" (p. 6) body 'energy' and motivation by "care" (p. 131), or more accurately "caring" (p. 10). Imagery stands for cognition, or the 'how' of human mental processes and the complex interactions between perception, body control, memory, and feedback systems, all within a "central assembly" (p. 287) of executive control. Consciousness is to be human, or the result of the structures and processes comprising a human being. The word denotes a uniquely human, non-specific 'site' of awareness, where information from motivation (affects, drives), cognitive (perception, motor, memory), and feedback subsystems is combined, duplicated, processed, and reported, or made conscious.

While Tomkins began with an interest in determining the essential motivations of humans as animal, he also needed to consider how people did what they did, and in turn, where consciousness fit in the puzzle. Initially, he divided his human being theory into two major halves. The first half of his total formulation, presented in volumes 1 (1962) and 2 (1963) of Affect Imagery Consciousness, is the most phenomenological in focussing on physiology, drives, affects, and other "nonspecific amplification" (p. 1) systems within the biological body. He was chasing the question, "What do human beings really want?" (p. 53). But, as a 'Personologist,' the study of personality in the tradition of Harvard professor Henry Murray, Tomkins easily understood that biology was only a beginning factor for theorizing a complex set of processes comprising individual humans. Biology could never be a full determinant of human beings. With the release of Affect Imagery Consciousness volumes 3 (1991) and 4 (1992), almost 30 years later, he directly confronted the second issue, cognition: How do humans do what they do? Answering the why? and how? of 'human beingness' became the foundation for his Human Being Theory. However, as his ideas developed, he recognized a missing link. Tomkins needed a third concept as an intermediary between cognition-motivation and consciousness. Thus he imagined Script Theory, which is explored most in Affect Imagery Consciousness volume 3.

== Affect theory ==
Tomkins' affect theory is detailed most in volumes 1 & 2 of Affect Imagery Consciousness. He first presented affect theory in 1954 at the Montreal meeting of the International Congress of Psychology with his paper "Consciousness and the unconscious in a model of the human being." Chapter one of AIC volume one is an expanded version of that early paper. He begins by challenging Freud and Hull's drive theory which dominated psychology at the time. Tomkins argued that the drives are inadequate general motivators and their priority a misinterpretation, or a "misidentification of the drive 'signal' with its 'amplifier'" (p. 53) . The drives are too time and body-place specific to account for the vast range of human 'wants' and 'don't wants.' Contrasting the drives, Tomkins' affects are general, flexible, and abstract.

Tomkins names nine 'affects' and they are universal, bio-chemical, neuro-physiological mechanisms and processes of the body that amplify triggering information. Nathanson (1992) succinctly calls affect the "biological portion of emotion" (p. 49). Tomkins' affects are not 'emotions.' Emotions, in this context, are a complex evolution of innate affect, felt experiences, and social development across a lifetime.

Michael Franz Basch and Donald Nathanson helped clarify Tomkins' notions of affect, feeling, and emotion as follows:

- affect: an evolutionary inheritance of universal, bio-chemical, neuro-physiological mechanisms and processes in the body that amplify, or make salient, triggering information.
- feeling: as with the James-Lange theory, feeling means "some level of awareness that an affect has been triggered" (p. 50). In fear, for example, the little hairs on the back of the neck may stand up; anger can trigger a clenched jaw and fist; humiliation can be felt as the embarrassment 'flush.' Following affect, feeling awareness begins "around eighteen to twenty-four months, when the involuntary based affective reaction begins to be related to a concept of the self" (p. 78).
- emotion: complex combinations of affects with personal memories and with the affects they also trigger. Nathanson: "Whereas affect is biology, emotion is biography" (p. 50). Given that the human organism is innately endowed with affect, E. Virginia Demos writes that the "newborn infant, then, has the capacity to experience affect but does not yet have past experience to draw on" (p. 76), and so has not yet learned to emote. Emotion is a "further step in affective maturation" resulting from joining feeling states "with experience to give personal meaning to complex concepts such as love, hate, and happiness" (p. 78).

Though affect is assumed as universal and feeling as ubiquitous (high similarity though individually nuanced and idiosyncratic), every person's experience of emotion is as unique as their experience. Of these working definitions, Lucas succinctly writes, the "steps affect-feeling-emotion, then, correspond to biology-psychology-biography, which in turn corresponds to a movement from the general to the particular to the specific. This is the biopsychosocial matrix in which every person exists" (p. 54).

Tomkins' nine named affects are: interest-excitement and enjoyment-joy; surprise-startle; distress-anguish, anger-rage, and fear-terror; disgust, dissmell, shame-humiliation. Importantly, the last three labels are better understood as drive auxiliaries (disgust, dissmell) and an affect auxiliary (shame-humiliation) rather than affects per se. The hyphen in each label indicates the range potential for each affect, from mild to extreme. Affect is also multi-faceted: "At the neurological level, affect is correlated with density of neural firing. At the behavioral level, affect is primarily facial response and secondarily bodily and visceral response. At the phenomenological level, affect may be considered a motive" (Tomkins and Izard, p. 88).

The two positive affects are:

- interest-excitement: optimal increasing neural density;
- and enjoyment-joy: decreasing neural density, the lower end of which Nathanson (1992) suggests can be thought of as "contentment" (p. 79) and following from intense affect stimulus;

The neutral:

- surprise-startle: very sudden increase, and functions as a cognitive 're-set' mechanism, thus allowing cognition (information processing) to shift attention.

The first negative three, which amplify their triggers, includes:

- fear-terror: increasing neural activity at higher rates than interest but lower than surprise;
- distress-anguish: non-optimal, high steady-state;
- and anger-rage: very high to extreme, non-optimal steady-state.

The second negative three, which attenuate their triggers, include two drive auxiliaries and an affect auxiliary:

- disgust: evolved from gustation;
- dissmell: evolved from olfaction;
- and shame-humiliation: curiously described by Tomkins (1995) as "an affluent emotion" (p. 392) because it involves an incomplete reduction in positive affect when faced with an impediment to positive social affiliation; but the experience feels bad.

The "auxiliary drive mechanisms" disgust and dissmell are not affects per se, but they have affect-like status because, though derived from the gustatory and olfactory systems, they "also function as signals and motives to others as well as to the self of feelings of rejection" (p. 84). Tomkins could not explain how the drive auxiliaries evolved from biological drive toward emotional expression, but he observed an "intrinsic connection" (p. 55) between disgust and dissmell, and the way humans express disapproval. In English, for example, the expression 'that's disgusting' is ubiquitous in judging perceived moral transgressions.

As a foundation for motivation, Tomkins answers his 'What do humans really want?' question with regard to the affects as follows. It is "all but inevitable" that humans will develop for "General Images," or Life Goals (p. 328):

1. Positive affect should be maximized
2. Negative affect should be minimized
3. Affect inhibition should be minimized
4. Power to maximize positive affect, to minimize negative affect, to minimize affect inhibition should be maximized.

This is the ground upon which human motivation is built.

== Script Theory ==
Tomkins' script theory is outlined most in volumes 3 & 4 of Affect Imagery Consciousness. Tomkins calls scripts "ways of living in the world" (p. 9). Human personality is a complex of affects and bodily functions, memory and mentation, cognition as 'information processing,' will, and importantly, personal experience in a social context.

Humans are born 'animal,' but also are, must be, and will be socialized into 'personae,' and script theory attempts to account for individual socializations within the bio-psycho-social complex of a lived life." (p.213-14). Tomkins and Mosher (1988) insist that "apart from the biology of reproduction, there are no inherent masculine or feminine roles" (p. 75). 'Feminine' and 'masculine' are, therefore, social constructs. Tomkins is also clear that both individuals and cultures have scripts.

In volume 3 of Affect Imagery Consciousness, Tomkins labels and defines hundreds of possible scripts, but makes it clear that a full taxonomy of all possible scripts is impossible. Script variations are as iterative as there are people and their individual experience. This is, in part, why scholars Adam Frank and Elizabeth Wilson (2020) write, "What Tomkins offers, then, is a periodic table of affective elements that combine to become any number of emotional molecular structures or substances" (p. 4). Implicit in Tomkins' writings is an encouragement to researchers, therapists, and theorists to label and define scripts as necessary.

Nonetheless, Tomkins outlines some important major categories of scripts, including:

Affect scripts

- control scripts: regulate consciousness of affects.
- management: invoked "when control is a problem, that is, when you have residual, backed-up affect that you do not know what to do with" (p. 342), management devises strategies primarily for handling negative affect.
- salience: weighs the relative importance of an affect: "Persons and activities are judged primarily by their affect payoff" (p. 343).

Nuclear scripts

Nuclear scripts are an ubiquitous set of scripts within individual psyches and common to psychic pathologies. They grow and fester from a moment when "a very good scene turns very bad" and attempt "to reverse the nuclear scene" (p. 376) by managing a contaminated ratio of positive to negative affect. They are an insidious emotional cycle characterized by "greed" for the "inflation of positive affect" (p. 376) against "cowardice" against the "inflation of negative affect intimidation, contamination, or confusion" (p. 377). Nuclear scripts involve 'double idealization' as a psyche alternates between trying to fix a perceived problem and inevitable failure as more "analogs"—"a state of affairs that is sufficiently similar to that which activates an affect or sufficiently similar to the affect itself, directly activates the affect" (p. 69)—accrue on the over-magnified original nuclear scene. At best, they succeed only partially and temporarily, because "Nuclear scripts are inherently involved in idealized defenses against idealized threats to idealized paradises" (p. 377).

Ideological scripts

Ideological scripts "attempt to provide general orientation of the place of human beings in the cosmos and in the society in which they live, an account of their central values, guidance for their realization, sanctions for their fulfillment, their violation, and their justification, and celebration of how life should be lived from here to eternity" (p. 353). Inherited from "a civilization, a nation, a religion, a gender, an age, an institution, a class, a region, a family, a profession, or school," ideological scripts represent "the various faiths by which human beings live and, alas, die" (p. 353). No person lives without ideological scripts, or 'idea systems,' because they "conjoin the three major functions of orientation, evaluation, and sanctions, and above all, because they endow fact with value and affect" (p. 353). Ideological scripts are social priority, and therefore, the most "important single class of scripts" (p. 353).

- evaluation scripts: all individuals develop evaluation scripts through socialization. These are 'ideological' in their concern with faith in the broadest sense, or how to "discriminate moral, aesthetic, and truth values, what to believe is good and bad, beautiful and ugly, true or false" (p. 342).
- orientation scripts: all people develop orientation scripts composed of conceptual space-time maps (a sense of time and place), theories (compressed but expandable information about the world), and instrumental skills based in individual experience, learning, and need.

Affect strategy scripts

- affluent scripts: With a "high ratio of dense positive over negative affect" (p. 344), this class of scripts suggests a person's life is governed by the affects interest-excitement and enjoyment-joy. People living predominantly affluent lives are generally happy because they maintain "stable high positive affect over negative affect" (p. 345) and they have "the capacity to understand and absorb negative affect when it is encountered" (p. 346), which is inevitable. As a life strategy, affluently scripted individuals "neither attempt to minimize negative affect nor to maximize positive affect nor satisfice, but rather attempt to optimize positive affect to achieve the optimal stable equilibrium. The distance between the ideal and the actual must not be so great as to demoralize, nor so small as to trivialize" (p. 345). With the affluent's positive outlook, problematic "shifts in costs, benefits, or probabilities are countered by scripted shifts in tactics to maintain the optimizing strategy against both overweening demands and against unavoidable disappointments" (p. 349).
- damage-reparation scripts: "one step away from heaven" (p. 391). In a personality's core, these scripts believe that an emotionally damaging scene can be repaired, and such people therefore have an optimistic outlook because they assume "that life could be beautiful" (p. 391). The affect investment here is shame-humiliation which, paradoxically, "is an affluent emotion" (p. 392) because, though bad in feeling, shame is activated only when a desired positive communion, or an exciting and enjoyable bond with others, is blocked in the immediate. For Tomkins, "shame is the incomplete reduction of interest or joy" (p. 84). Full-formed and sustained humiliation, however, is toxic, particularly in the sense that the humiliated person feels 'fully exposed' and 'mortified' (p. 185).
- limitation-remediation scripts: not quite neutral, these scripts seek to limit and remedy negative scenes by turning toward a positive. This concerns directionality in the differential magnification the positive to negative affect ratio. As scene limitations are perceived, consciously or unconsciously, these scripts "involve an optimizing strategy" (p. 349) for dealing with "long-term bad situations, but situations which demand and which can be improved" (p. 393). Thus is their aim to remediate the low-level noxious, steady-state affect of distress(-anguish) from those "aspects of life which are less than ideal, but which must be confronted and can be confronted" (p. 391). As Tomkins suggests, "Millions of people over thousands of years have faced lives less than perfect, to which they had to adapt in some way or another. This kind of script got at that large class of human concerns" (p. 391).
- (de)contamination scripts: shifting massively toward the negative, contamination scripts influence individual social performance. They are ambivalent, plurivalent, resistant to decontamination. They can involve equal density of positive to negative affect, but they "use a self-defeating double strategy of both minimizing negative affect and of maximizing positive affect, and so do neither" (p. 351). Based on the drive auxiliary disgust, this script class suggest that a person is trying to remove a psychic contaminant when an "impurity is introduced into a life. It may have been good before, or it may have always been bad, but [it] is recognized by the individual as, not a permanent limitation, but an impurity, a contamination" (p. 391). Tomkins calls disgust in this context a "disenchantment" response, and he emphasizes "both dis and enchantment" (p. 393), attraction and repulsion. Contamination scripts are frequently manifest in nuclear scripts.
- (anti)toxic scripts: when affect-feelings become "intolerable punishment which must be either eliminated, attenuated, escaped, or avoided—somehow destroyed" (p. 392), toxic scripts are in play and they are psychically dangerous. Completely opposite to affluence, they have a "stable ratio of negative over positive affect" (p. 352), and thus involve the "greatest distance between actuality and the individual's ideals" (p. 352). Toxically scripted people are ruled by terror, rage, and dissmell. High-order anguish and deep humiliation are also often involved with toxic individuals. They are "exiled from their native land; they are put into chains. . . . It can happen at any time, to any of us" (p. 392). Toxic scripts often manifest as "dangerous" contempt, the "least attractive of human responses," which combines anger, terror, and dissmell with the aim of rejecting and degrading an Other, often in "severely hierarchical relationships," because the other is judged "less than human" (p. 394).

Depending on the actual context of discussion, Tomkins may or may not use the prefixes 'de' and 'anti' with contamination and toxic respectively to indicate specific affect density, changes in felt affect density, and/or direction of affect change. Prefix use implicates script objectives, or whether or not a person seeks (probably consciously) to improve a scene-script or whether they continue (unconsciously) to magnify a scene's problematic elements, as with nuclear scripts. Under the influence of disgust, for example, unhealthy contamination may continue to increase until the person passes into toxicity. A person may, however, take positive steps to improve a specific scene or a life script. This is a decontaminating act. Similarly, a person can languish toxicity, or they can take antitoxic action. Also, although the negative affects feel bad, their evolutionary development involves positive and necessary responses. Appropriate fear, for example, keeps us alert and alive in dangerous situations; that is its bio-evolutionary function.

Other major categories of scripts delineated in Affect Imagery Consciousness volume 3 and elsewhere include:

- commitment scripts;
- counteractive scripts;
- depressive scripts;
- destructive scripts;
- instrumental scripts;
- macho scripts;
- mini-maximizing scripts; and
- recasting scripts.

According to Wiederman, social scripts provide meaning and direction on how to respond to specific situations (Wiederman, 2005). Without scripts we would not be able to identify correct or appropriate responses to specific situations.

== Human Being Theory ==
Human Being Theory, so-called, is detailed in Volume 4 of Affect Imagery Consciousness. Tomkins was Director of the Clinical Training Program in Psychology at Princeton from 1947 to 1965, and his human being theory results in part from his clinical research into primary human motivations. He held degrees in play-writing (BA), psychology (MA and post-doctoral), and philosophy (doctoral and post-doctoral). As academic study was evermore specialized, he remained "a generalist, but a generalist with exactitude" (p. 50). Having been mentored in part by the 'personologist' Henry Murray while at Harvard, Tomkins searched for a grand theory of personality that could itemize and interrelate the "set of dependent variables struggling for independence" in the "biopsychosocial domain" (p. 308) in the formation of a person.

His general human personality theory examines the constant, ever changing, always complex interactions between the social, the psychological, and the biological spheres in which every personality is found. As a personologist, Tomkins explained that personality must be "defined in terms of process. Personality or any personality variable can be adequately understood only as process within the larger socio-cultural environmental process" (p. 83).

Tomkins' affect theory is contained within his script theory which is contained within human being theory. He chose the label 'human being theory' to differentiate his formulation from psychology in general and the dominance of traditional psychoanalysis, and to distinguish human psychology from general animal psychology. He writes: "Script theory examines the varieties of particular ways of living in the world," whereas human being theory "is concerned with how such phenomena are possible at all" (p. 9).

If Affect denotes human (and animal) motivation beginning in biology as an energy amplifying mechanism, and Imagery denotes information processing, then Consciousness for Tomkins is a uniquely human synergy of motivational, cognitive, informational, and feedback subsystems. Consciousness is the non-specific 'site' of self-awareness, by degrees conscious and unconscious, resulting from a "central assembly" (p. 113).

Tomkins was a systems thinker. One can refer to an individual 'human being,' but any organism comprises multiple parts working together. At the time he began articulating his human being theory, much of the related theorising continued around what Antonio Damasio (1994) calls 'Descartes' Error,' the disconnection of the mind from the body. Such separation was impossible for Tomkins. A human being come person could only ever be an integration of dependent, independent, and interdependent structures and processes comprising a singular organism where biological, psychological, and social influences intersect. (p. 46).

Complex systems are, of necessity, composed of subsystems, with each subsystem dealing with partial but crucial to the whole tasks. One component cannot be removed or changed without affecting all others. Any macroscopic object, for example, is an assembly of minute sub-atomic components, the movements of which are conditioned in relations of energy. This is the Affect component of the human being. But if the metaphor is expanded, how does the atom 'know' how to use energy in systemic organizations? Information manipulation is the key. This is the Imagery component in Tomkins' human being as organized system.

In the early 1950s, Tomkins was influenced by Norbert Wiener's (1949; 1961) seminal Cybernetics: or, Control and Communication in the Animal and the Machine. In cybernetics discourse, he found metaphors and signifiers for human cognition and mentation. Cybernetic vocabulary such hardware and software are common today in describing human mentation, but Tomkins embraced this terminology relatively early in its development.

According to Raymond Kurzweil (1990), Wiener is responsible for three major shifts in the human worldview (p. 190-98). The first shift is from prioritizing energy processing by an organism to an emphasis on the processing and using of information as an organizational control. (The second shift is from an analogue to digital accounting of that information. Third is a conceptual shift from theoretically reversible Newtonian time to irreversible Bergsonian time based on partial information destruction during energy processes.) All organisms must use energy to live, but the means of control became 'information' management.

Cognitive subsystems evolved, for Tomkins, to manage the infinitude of but indispensable transformations of information, or the transformation of perceptual, motor, memory, and feedback information into forms the organism can 'use.' Cognition as information management and transformation is a trait shared across the living, organic world and different only by degree of evolutionary complexity. As an evolutionary ground for motivation, the affect subsystems make urgent, or amplify, their triggers, and thus, as cognition deals with information management, so amplification is the energy to be managed.

This leads to Tomkins asking, "If we define cognition as those mechanisms that have the power to process and transform 'information' and oppose this system to the amplifier mechanisms of the reticular formation—drives, pain, and affects that are specialized for amplification of information—then what are we to call the higher-order mechanisms and processes whereby both affect and cognition are integrated into scripts?" (p. 10). 'Minding' is his answer: "Minding stresses at once both its cognitive process mentality and its caring characteristics. The human being then is a minding system composed of cognitive and affective subsystems" (p. 10). By blending verb and noun forms in the gerund 'minding,' he declares that not only is information being processed, but a person both thinks about and cares about their experiences in real time, retroactively, and proactively.

How are the two halves of human being theory, motivation and cognition, correlated? There "is a set of relations of partial independence, partial dependence, and partial interdependence that vary in their interrelationships, conditional upon the specific state of the whole system at any one moment" (p. 7).

Segregating the motivational and cognitive elements may serve theorizing, but of course in living reality there is complete "interpenetration and interconnectedness" (p. 7). Motivation begins with affect "amplification" (p. 49), but that is "a special type of [information] transformation. Cognitions coassembled with affects become hot and urgent. Affects coassembled with cognitions become better informed and smarter" (p. 7). These two large subsystems must be functionally and utterly unified for a human being (or any mobile organism) to face the world successfully: "Amplification without transformation would be blind; transformation without amplification would be weak" (p. 7), writes Tomkins.

Scripts are generated by the minding system to organize the ever-changing world into "structures of meaning" (Smith, 1995, p. 10). They operate where the motivational and cognitive subsystems interconnect. Managing ever-changing information is an acute necessity of consciousness, and "Mobility is the key" to consciousness (p. 11), argued Tomkins in 1962. Compared with a plant rooted to the ground, an animal requires massively higher information analysis and control in confronting the ever-changing world, and humans require a yet higher degree of informational control in the context of our constructed socio-cultural complexity. Animals must make complex decisions about want and need, and the more 'complex' the animal and its environment, the more complex the decisions, thus producing increased demand for 'consciousness.'

Complex and effective solutions to function in the world require efficient information control, management, and organization. Scripts bind affect, imagery, and consciousness together. Through "scripts a human being experiences the world in organized scenes, some close to, some remote from, the heart's desire. [They do] not live to think or to feel but to optimize the world as he experiences it from scene to scene" (p. 9). Another way to envision scripts is: "Information changes faster than the rules which order it. The information in scenes is made urgent by our affects, and particularly by any consequential changes in the intensity or polarity of our affects." (p. 79), which scripts organize. Tomkins writes: "Script theory examines the varieties of particular ways of living in the world," whereas human being theory "is concerned with how such phenomena are possible at all" (p. 9).

Tomkins points to an "ambiguity" (p. 9) at the intersection of affect amplification and cognitive transformation which may confuse how we understand the two systems. While separate abstractions such as affects, scripts, and cognitions are contrived in theorizing, they are indivisible in living reality. Ambiguity is an intrinsic cost of any organized system, he suggests. Analogically, language and the "linguistic chain" (p. 10) in combination with 'body language' show how people create many meanings in many areas. The minding system, in both cognitive process and caring guises, generates scripts as systemic 'rules,' or guidelines "for the interpretation, evaluation, prediction, production, or control of scenes" (p. 334), much as effective communication through language requires a blend of linguistic codes, grammars, dictions and syntax, pragmatics and semantics.

Here are some major informing concepts for Tomkins' human being theory. (For a more thorough glossary of terms for Tomkins' unique terminology, see Lucas (2018).):

1. central assembly: the 'site' of consciousness, the central assembly (CA) has no specific, physical location in the brain, but is a cognition-combination of structures, processes, and products as neural patterns as messages are "transmuted" (p. 29) into conscious reports, or imagery. The CA adds, redacts, subtracts perceptual, motoric, and memory messages depending on comparative density of firing of competing messages at a given moment.
2. cognition: Tomkins describes 'cognition' as a structural mechanism with the power to transform information as much as the more typically defined process. He does "not regard cognition as a separate mechanism, as [with] memory, perception, and the motoric." Cognition is "the system which in interaction orders all the particular subsystems. Cognition, therefore, is to the mind as life is to the body. Life is not the heart, nor the lungs, nor the blood but the organization of these mechanisms. So minding or cognition is the organization of memory, perception, and action as well as of affect. Cognition is the most general ordering principle which governs the human being" (p. 563, emphasis added).
3. consciousness: "a unique type of duplication by which some aspects of the world reveal themselves to another part of the same world" (p. 115). Consciousness is not wakefulness, but a mechanism reporting affect-driven imagery to the central assembly (p. 353): "In summary, consciousness is not wakefulness, and wakefulness is not consciousness. Nor is wakefulness a level of amplification, nor a level of affective arousal. Consciousness, wakefulness, amplification, and affect are maintained by independent mechanisms that are interdependent to the extent to which they constitute an overlapping central assembly. The empirical correlations between the states subserved by these mechanisms are a consequence of the frequency with which these partially independent mechanisms do in fact enter into the combined assemblies" (p. 322).
4. feedback mechanism: a central efferent (outward) process attempting to duplicate sets of afferent (inward) messages at the central assembly, feedback is the basis for comparison between conscious and unconscious Images and imagery. (See additional discussion below.)
5. Image: "the centrally generated blueprints which control the feedback mechanisms" (p. 327), an Image is a "desired future report" in consciousness (p. 455). The uppercase 'I' is purposeful in this context and in contrast with the lowercase in 'imagery.'
6. imagery: afferent sensory and/or memory messages made conscious, imagery is "created by decomposition and synthesis of sensory and stored messages" (p. 14) within the central assembly. In Tomkins' ideation, imagery is not 'pictographic,' though that could be a special case, but better understood as 'neural patterns.'
7. memory: aims "to create a unique object," in contrast with a "conceptual strategy" which aims "to create, ideally, an infinite set of objects" (p. 457), and so indicates the difference between specific and general cognitive information. Storage of (at least partial) information is automatic; retrieval is a learned process based on a feedback mechanism, which allows cognitive comparisons, under central control. To be able to 'memorize,' therefore, is the ability "to reproduce past experience, to retrieve information, which has been permanently stored without reliance on sensory input" (p. 457).
8. motor: the "translation" of a "desired future sensory report into the appropriate motor" action (p. 454).
9. perception: partitioning of the scene into figure (the most salient information in a scene, or that which is in the 'foreground' of consciousness) and ground (all available but non-salience information in a scene, and so everything happening in the 'background' of conscious cognition).

Discussion: the feedback mechanism in human being theory

At the core of Tomkins' concept of cognition, most broadly understood, is the required feedback loop. The basic feedback cycle is: Image — imagery — Image — imagery, all the time in all cognitive spheres, including affect because the Image-imagery relationship operates not only on the grand scale, but in all aspects of integrated affect imagery consciousness processes, in and under the Central Assembly, which is ever-monitoring the interrelationships between affect, memory, thinking, perception, and action.

Image-imagery is a feedback loop: imagery represents all incoming messages within the Central Assembly; Image is out-going messages. The uppercase 'I' is relevant. Tomkins' specific definition of imagery is: reports made conscious and "created by decomposition and synthesis of sensory and stored messages" (p. 14) within the central assembly. By contrast, Image (capital I) is a "desired future report" (p. 455) in consciousness, something we want, a projection. By definition, Image is "the centrally generated blueprints which control the feedback mechanism" (p. 327).

In effect, Tomkins describes a 'dialogue' between the outside world, the medium of containment or the 'ground' of human action, and the inside world, or the 'figure,' that moves (knowingly and not-knowingly) within the medium, and the manifestation of that dialogue in a neural feedback loop. These are the necessary conditions for 'learning' writ large.

A look at mechanical movements of the body helps reveal the process, and Tomkins uses a dart player to demonstrate:

- the dart thrower steps to the line, places a foot, sights the board and a specific portion as the target;
- the thrower raises an arm, dart in hand, and focuses more tightly on the specific target, be it the 'big' 20 wedge, the triple-18 section, or the bull's-eye;
- thrower draws back the arm, feathers to nose, target focused;
- the thrower is generating an Image, a desired future imagery report, of the dart's flight path;
  - but, it is not actually the flight path that is projected, but a feelable action of the body that will launch and deliver the missile to the desire outcome;
- the player throws, and monitors the flight path to the goal, the desired specific target;
- perception now takes over and generates visual imagery reports about the relative degree of match to the initial and instigating Image;

The feedback mechanism generates reports on the basis on this question: what is the degree of match between the initial Image and perceptual imagery?

If the dart thrower hits the target successfully, the feedback is positive, and the player must now attempt to absolutely replicate the preceding attempt, which would demonstrate control. But the conditions must have inherently and of necessity changed because time has moved forward. At very least, the arm has been lowered and another dart picked up. The player has, therefore, taken eyes off the target. The process must start again from not-quite scratch because there is a memory of the preceding, and all preceding, attempts.

If, on the other hand, the dart thrower was not successful in hitting the target, the feedback loop report is negative, and the thrower will now initiate another attempt by adjusting to correct any error in memory-motor-perception as reported by the feedback loop.

Thus can Tomkins write: "Our hypothetical dart thrower must learn his own neurological pathways from the feedback from the external world and coordinate this derived knowledge of his own body with the information from outside the body. The learning of control is extended and deepened in a variety of ways. . . . [but] practice without knowledge of results yields no learning" (p. 335). So, without that feedback loop and the constant comparison of Image with imagery, no adjustment is possible, so no learning is possible. But with the ever-present feedback loop, one can move toward control and thus can instrumentality, or 'do-ability,' increase. The difference between an expert and an every-person is the developed quality of their ability to match Image to imagery to Image to imagery in the feedback cycle.

Given this understanding of cognition as a feedback process of matching an Image, a desired future imagery report, with active imagery reporting at the Central Assembly, the 'site' of consciousness, how is the affect-motive component involved?

Affect and cognition, the two major halves of human being theory, are always completely integrated in living reality, though they might be teased apart for philosophical discussion. What might happen, then, if we put the dart player in a social context? The affective may become primary. If, for example, the dart player misses and experiences humiliation, a feeling of failure exposure before an audience, there may be motor troubling mismatch between intended success (affective self-Image) and the actual failure (affective self-imagery) as the cognitive feedback loop (perception) is flooded by a disruptive affective feedback loop.

But what if the dart player is not prone to shame, but is rather biassed toward focussing on the physical actions of achievement? The cognitive may then have and maintain primacy. One of things that makes great athletes great is their ability to fail publicly, but also to forget and/or not dwell on that embarrassment, while turning their attention to the next and future potential success. The evil-eye doesn't trouble great athletes. That doesn't mean they don't feel the evil-eye, only that they're not focussed on the negative exposure, but rather focussed by it.

== Ideology and Ideo-Affective Postures ==
A "complete science" of humans and humanity, suggests Tomkins, "must focus not only on the causal mechanisms underlying cognition, affect and action, but also on the cultural products of" humans: "Man is to be found as much in his language, his art, in his science, in his economic, political and social institutions, as he is to be found in his cerebrum, in his nervous system, and in his genes" (p. 109). (Regarding gendered pronouns, in a footnote at the beginning of the Script Theory section of Exploring Affect, Tomkins includes the following comment: "Inasmuch as I object equally to gender bias and to gender blindness, but even more to the impersonal, neutered, and abstract circumlocution, I have adopted the less than optimal device of alternating attribution of gender in succeeding sections of this chapter" (p. 312)

Social constructs and the constructions of human societies are motivated by ideas, ideas about what is and what isn't, what should be versus what shouldn't be, ideas about good versus bad, valuable or not valuable, right versus wrong. Ideas trigger human affects, they make humans feel. If a psychological 'object' is anything triggering an affect, then ideas are powerful affect objects, and ideologies are emotionally charged objects.

What, then, is the correlation between personality structure and ideology? In Tomkins' schema, ideas and idea-systems are incorporated into a personality as a function of how and which affects they engage. The affects, by their very nature, make humans care, so if an idea-system, an 'ideology,' interests or excites or infuriates or disgusts no person, it cannot and will not prosper.

As ever with Tomkins, interpreting and understanding of his topical discourses begins with his idiosyncratic vocabulary and functional definitions.

- His working definition for ideology: "any organized set of ideas about which humans are at once most articulate, ideas that produce enduring controversy over long periods of time and that evoke passionate partisanship, and ideas about which humans are least certain because there is insufficient evidence" (p. 26). Also: "At the growing edge of the frontier of all sciences there necessarily is a maximum of uncertainty, and what is lacking in evidence is filled by passion and faith, and hatred and scorn for the disbelievers" (p. 111). This broad definition is flexible and adaptable to any potential field of human concern and study.

Depending on individual ideo-affective resonances, people must constantly, both individually and collectively, negotiate and re-negotiate idea orientations for daily life, which is a central function of ideological scripts as they "attempt to provide general orientation of the place of human beings in the cosmos and in the society in which they live, an account of their central values, guidance for their realization, sanctions for their fulfillment, their violation, and their justification, and celebration of how life should be lived from here to eternity" (p. 353). Inherited from "a civilization, a nation, a religion, a gender, an age, an institution, a class, a region, a family, a profession, or school," ideological scripts represent "the various faiths by which human beings live and, alas, die" (p. 353). No person lives without ideological scripts, or 'idea systems,' because they "conjoin the three major functions of orientation, evaluation, and sanctions, and above all, because they endow fact with value and affect" (p. 353). ideological scripts are, therefore, the most "important single class of scripts" (p. 353).

As idea-systems developed in Western thought, argues Tomkins, an ubiquitous polarity between Protagoras' suggestion that "man is the measure of all things" versus Plato's "Ideas and Essences as the realm of reality and value" (p. 117). The polarity is also presented in question form—"Is man the measure, an end in himself, an active, creative, thinking, desiring, loving force in nature? Or must man realize himself, attain his full stature only through struggle toward, participation in, conformity to a norm, a measure, an ideal essence basically prior to and independent of man?" (p. 117)—and a person's answers typically reflect their ideo-affective resonance.

In his major discussions of and research on ideo-affective postures, Tomkins appears to promote an idea-systems dichotomy, a full binary opposition between 'left' and 'right' postures in Western thought. Tomkins writes, "When man has thought about man he has either glorified himself or denigrated himself. He has judged himself to be inherently good or basically evil, to be the source of all value or to be worthless" (p. 117). This either-or dichotomy is atypical of Tomkins' mode of theorizing, which typically involves long lists of contingencies—if this, so that; but if this other, so that other; if another, so this third other, and so on—or what Sedgwick and Frank (1995) call his "alchemy of the contingent" (p. 6) [21]. In fact, while he often emphasizes the extremes to demonstrate his points, ideo-affective postures, and dynamic interactions of ideology and affect, exist as a polarized continuum.

Kant's philosophy epitomizes this fusion: "How could one synthesize a foundation for morality which was personal and subjective and at the same time universal and objective? . . . It was that one should act in such a way that what one did could be universalized. Be yourself, find morality within, but let it be possible that your morality is capable of serving as a norm for mankind. As in his metaphysics and epistemology, [Kant] unites the creative and subjective with the universal and objective" (p. 125). And as Irving Alexander points out, Tomkins himself occupied an unsettled middling position: "He was neither a right-winger nor a left-winger, but both, and only rarely was he able to achieve a middle position. He preferred the left, was plagued by the right, and struggled with the incompatibility endlessly" (p. 105).

The left-right ideological polarity may be reflected by the Greek philosophers Plato versus Protagoras, but a gendered bifurcation of the affects might be traced much farther back in social-evolution, suggests Tomkins. In hunting cultures, "origins and deities became masculine, skyward transcendent, aggressive, possessive, intolerant, competing with men, taking sides in covenants with elected men against their enemies, punishing their favored men when they contested for divine power," but in agricultural societies, "origins and deities became immanent earth or sea mothers, indulgent if sometimes capricious, a plenum that contracts and expands slowly (rather than quickly and destructively), more fixed than mobile, more conservative than radical and discontinuously creative, more cyclical than linear. In one, men dominate the society. In the other, women dominate" (p. 160-61).

The "intensification of violence and warfare, first against big game animals and then against human beings . . . ultimately produced the now universal bifurcation, polarity, and stratification of the innate affects into excitement, surprise, anger, disgust, and dissmell versus enjoyment, distress, shame and fear. . . . The major dynamic of ideological differentiation and stratification arises from perceived scarcity and the reliance upon violence to reduce such scarcity to allocate scarce resources disproportionately to the victors in adversarial contests" (p. 161-62).

From these claims, we can imagine warrior scripts as a subset of toxic scripts versus agriculturalist scripts, which carry an affect affluence script bias. As Tomkins says, the "successful warrior is excited, ready for surprise, angry and proud, contemptuous and fearless. The loser has given up and is relaxed in dubious enjoyment, crying in distress, terrified and humble and ashamed. It is a very small step to assign these demeaned affects to women inasmuch as they are readily defeated by men in physical combat" (p. 163).

At first glance and by the standards of modern critical theory, the obvious seeming problem with Tomkins' polarity theory is this opposing and apparent essentializing of the nine affects into a fundamental gendered binary. But, with respect to scripts and gender, "apart from the biology of reproduction, there are no inherent masculine or feminine roles" (Tomkins and Mosher, p. 75). Gendered roles are social constructs within an ideo-affective context. Lucas (2018, p. 63), for example, in a footnote to a discussion of Tomkins' ideo-affective polarity, points to the infamous photographs from Abu Ghraib of American soldier Lynndie England with Iraqi prisoners on a leash and belittling their 'manhood' to demonstrate this socialized 'inversion' as US military training conditions some young women to be warriors, or to be 'men.'

Many of his claims around about the polarity, especially if taken out of context, would provoke the ire of critics in modern-day humanities and social sciences for the binary structure of the analysis and conclusions. Even while complimenting and endorsing Tomkins' work, Sedgwick and Frank (1995) referred his "highly suspect scientism" (p. 2) [21]. But Tomkins himself points to Michael Nesbitt's 1959 article "Friendship, Love and Values" as the first empirical study of the polarity theory which appears to confirm many of the conclusions (p. 138). In 2020, Nilsson and Jost published a study of polarity theory in the United States and Sweden in which they "conclude that polarity theory possesses considerable potential to explain how conflicts between [ideological] worldviews shape contemporary politics" (p. 1), even though its value is "largely lost on contemporary researchers," but also that "polarity theory is more relevant today than ever before" given the "ideological polarization in society" (p. 26).

== Queer theory ==
In their paper Shame in the Cybernetic Fold: Reading Silvan Tomkins, Queer theorist Eve Kosofsky Sedgwick and Science and Technology Studies Professor Adam Frank examine the relevance of Tomkin's work for queer theory as well as poststructuralist theory more generally, arguing that Tomkins' work may provide important epistemological insights about the self.

== Bibliography ==
- Tomkins, Silvan S. (1962), Affect Imagery Consciousness: Volume I, The Positive Affects. London: Tavistock.
- Tomkins, Silvan S. (1963), Affect Imagery Consciousness: Volume II, The Negative Affects.
- Tomkins, Silvan S. (1991), Affect Imagery Consciousness Volume III. The Negative Affects: Anger and Fear New York: Springer.
- Tomkins, Silvan S. and Bertram P. Karon (1962–1992), Affect, Imagery, Consciousness Volume IV New York: Springer.
- Tomkins, Silvan S. (1934), Conscience, self love and benevolence in the system of Bishop Butler, University of Pennsylvania.
- Tomkins, Silvan S. and H.A. Murray (1943), Contemporary Psychopathology: A Source Book. Cambridge, Mass.: Harvard University Press.
- Tomkins, Silvan S. and Elizabeth J. Tomkins (1947), The Thematic Apperception Test: The Theory and Technique of Interpretation New York, Grune & Stratton.
- Tomkins, Silvan S. and John Burnham Miner (1957), The Tomkins-Horn Picture Arrangement Test New York: Springer.
- Tomkins, Silvan S. and John B. Miner (1959), PAT Interpretation: Scope and Technique New York: Springer.
- Tomkins, Silvan S. and Samuel Messick (1963), Computer Simulation of Personality: Frontier of Psychological Theory New York: Wiley.
- Tomkins, Silvan S. and Carroll E. Izard (1965), Affect, Cognition, and Personality: Empirical Studies New York: Springer.

== See also ==
- Discrete emotion theory

== Sources ==
- The Tomkins Institute
