= The Duess Test =

Psychoanalytic theory projective test for children

The Duess Test is a projective test for young children. It consists of ten short incomplete stories to which children must think of endings. The test was developed in Switzerland by Louisa Düss. The test, which is also known as Duess fables, was first translated to English by Louise Despert in 1946. It was later revised by practitioners such as Reuben Fine, who expanded the stories to 20.

The reliability of the Duess Test has been questioned due to its artificiality and expert recommendations that it should be used only for children under 11 years old.

== Theoretical basis ==
The test is grounded in psychoanalytic theory, particularly focusing on early developmental stages and unconscious fantasies. It was developed by as a way to assess psychological states that may not be easily expressed through conventional means, particularly in situations involving high emotional tension or conflict.

== Applications in psychoanalysis and psychosomatic research ==
The Louisa Düss Psychoanalytical Stories Test has been utilized in psychoanalytic research to explore the psychological development of patients with psychosomatic disorders. In one such study, researchers investigated patients suffering from gastro-colitis, focusing on their emotional and physiological responses. The Düss Test was used alongside interviews to assess patients' psychological states, revealing a fixation on the early oral stage of development, which is associated with passive and receptive behaviors.

Additionally, the study observed a significant link between the patients' psychological tendencies and their biological responses. Through tests measuring the activity of the parasympathetic nervous system, researchers found that these patients showed a higher parasympathetic tone, which is typically associated with rest and recovery processes in the body. This connection between psychological fixation and physical symptoms suggested that stress and social conflict, common among the patients, played a role in triggering physical reactions tied to earlier developmental stages. The Duess Test was pivotal in identifying these psychological regressions, offering insights into the complex interplay between mental and physical health.

== Clinical applications ==
The Louisa Düss Psychoanalytical Stories Test has been used in various clinical contexts to gain insight into the psychological state of patients dealing with significant emotional stress or psychosomatic conditions. For instance, it has been applied in pediatric settings to understand children's unconscious anxieties related to medical treatments, such as surgery.

One such study involved children between the ages of five and twelve who were preparing for surgery. In addition to the Düss Test, the children underwent a playful interview to help facilitate the expression of their fears and emotions. The study revealed that children often experience surgery as a threat to both their physical and emotional integrity. Through the use of the test, researchers were able to identify that the children's unconscious fantasies played a dual role: they acted both as regressive defenses and as protective structures. These fantasies helped children manage the anxieties and fears related to the surgery, including fear of death, which are commonly mobilized during such traumatic events.

By combining the use of the Louisa Düss Psychoanalytical Stories Test with other therapeutic methods, clinicians were able to uncover the children's emotional responses to surgery, thus facilitating a more empathetic and effective approach to medical treatment. This approach is particularly helpful in situations where children are unable to verbalize their fears or are subjected to medical procedures without being able to fully understand them.

== Summary of the Original Duess Fables ==
Fable One – The Bird

A family of birds is displaced during a powerful storm. The mother and father fly to separate trees, leaving their child to decide what to do on their own.

Fable Two – Wedding Anniversary

On the occasion of their wedding anniversary, the parents of a child share a loving moment. However, the child quietly leaves the celebration to sit alone in the corner of the garden.

Fable Three – The Lamb

After a mother sheep gives birth to a new lamb, she tells her older child that they must now begin eating grass, as there is no longer enough milk to provide for both the new lamb and the older one.

Fable Four – Death

a. A child watches a funeral procession for someone who lived on their street.

b. (For children unfamiliar with death) A relative is embarking on a long train journey, and the child is told that they will not be returning.

Fable Five – Anxiety

A child experiences anxiety.

Fable Six – The Elephant

A child returns to their favorite toy elephant only to discover that it looks entirely different.

Fable Seven – The Clay Object

A child is asked by their mother to give her a clay toy that they themselves created.

Fable Eight – Walking with the Parent

A child goes for a walk with one parent of the opposite gender. Upon returning home, the child notices that the other parent seems unhappy.

Fable Nine – News

A child is told by their mother that she has news to share with them.

Fable Ten – Bad Dreams

A child wakes up from a disturbing dream.
