= Wayne H. Holtzman =

American psychologist (1923–2019)

- Born: January 16, 1923
- Died: January 23, 2019 (aged 96)
- Citizenship: American
- Education: Northwestern University(MA); Stanford University(PhD)
- Known for: Development of the Holtzman Inkblot Test
- Spouse: Joan King (m. 1947)
- Children: 4
- Awards: Bruno Klopfer Award (1988)
- Scientific career
- Fields: Research psychology
- Workplaces: University of Texas at Austin
- Academic advisors: E. R. (Jack) Hilgard
- Doctoral students: Carolyn Sherif

Wayne Harold Holtzman (January 16, 1923 – January 23, 2019) was an American psychologist best known for the development of the Holtzman Inkblot Test. Holtzman received a master's degree from Northwestern University and a doctorate from Stanford University. He worked at the University of Texas at Austin from 1949 until he retired in 1993. He developed the Holtzman Inkblot Test to address deficiencies in the Rorschach test.

== Early life and education ==
Holtzman was born in 1923 in Chicago, Illinois, where he attended elementary and high school. His father was an agricultural engineer and his mother was a schoolteacher. He recalled his father taking him on fishing trips from when he was five years old and he developed a love for the North Woods of Wisconsin. He joined the Sea Scouts as a teenager, a favorite activity of his which led to his decision to join the Navy. During high school he worked 20 hours a week at the local cleaner and tailor shop, eventually saving enough money to pay for his first year at Northwestern University, where he was awarded a scholarship in chemistry. He received a BS degree in chemistry in 1944 before being commissioned as an ensign in the U.S. Navy. His interest in psychology came after serving as an anti-aircraft gunnery officer aboard the USS Iowa, where he observed first-hand the behavior of men under stress in life-threatening combat situations.

After being discharged from active duty in 1946, Holtzman took a job at Northwestern University as a laboratory assistant while working on his master's degree, which he completed the following year. Holtzman and his fiancée, Joan King, were married in August 1947 before moving to Stanford, California. He took a position as a teaching assistant under E. R. (Jack) Hilgard at Stanford University, where he received a Ph.D. in Psychology and Statistics in 1950 with a dissertation on the Rorschach technique.

== Career ==
Holtzman began his career at the University of Texas at Austin in 1949 when he accepted an appointment as assistant professor in the psychology department. From 1950 to 1953 he taught extension courses in statistics and test theory at the School of Aviation Medicine in San Antonio, while also working as the primary research scientist on an Air Force contract developing new psychiatric screening instruments for the purpose of improving the selection of Air Force pilots. This research highlighted issues with the validity of the Rorschach test although Holtzman continued to believe that the fundamental ideas behind the test still had merit in light of separate research he had recently completed.

In 1955 he was appointed the executive director of the University of Texas Hogg Foundation for Mental Hygiene (later renamed to the Hogg Foundation for Mental Health), where he had been a consultant since 1952. The foundation had recently enlarged its research and publication program and Holtzman's new position allowed him to work on the development of a new personality test modelled after the Rorschach. He remained in the position of associate director until 1970 when he was appointed as the president of the Hogg Foundation, a position he held until 1993.

In mid-1955 Holtzman was asked by Werner Wolff, secretary-general of the Interamerican Society of Psychology, if he would host the Third Interamerican Congress of Psychology at The University of Texas. Holtzman received strong support from the university and the congress was held in December 1955. This led to further international projects spanning several decades, including research projects in Mexico and exchanges of psychology faculty and students from several Mexican universities.

He was elected as president of the Texas Psychological Association in 1956 for a one-year term. In 1959 he was elected president of the Southwestern Psychological Association and was promoted to professor by the University of Texas at Austin the same year.

In 1962 Holtzman was added to the list of Who's Who in America. The University of Texas appointed Holtzman dean of the College of Education in 1964, a position he held until 1970, and in 1966 Holtzman took the position of editor of the Journal of Educational Psychology, which publishes "psychological research pertaining to education across all ages and educational levels." Over the course of his tenure with the University of Texas at Austin, Holtzman also served as chairman of the university's Faculty Computer Committee and chairman of the Laboratory for Computer-Assisted Instruction.

Holtzman was secretary-general of the International Union of Psychological Science (IUPsuS) from 1972 to 1984 and was President from 1984 to 1988, a role in which he was involved with psychologists internationally and assisted in organising international conferences in order to facilitate the sharing of new ideas and scientific information between psychologists from different nations.

Holtzman served a four-year term on the National Advisory Mental Health Council for the Alcohol, Drug Abuse and Mental Health Administration from 1978.

Holtzman retired in 1993 but continued to serve on a part-time basis with the Hogg Foundation.

== Holtzman Inkblot Technique ==
In 1961 Holtzman released the Holtzman Inkblot Technique (HIT), also known as the Holtzman Inkblot Test, which he had been developing for the previous 10 years. It was designed as a replacement for the Rorschach test which had a number of deficiencies. The HIT was a standardized measurement that was considered to be more reliable than the Rorschach. The test consisted of a series of 45 cards with a single response accepted for each card, as opposed to the Rorschach test which consisted of 10 cards to which multiple responses could be given. However, not all psychologists accept the validity of the HIT. Psychologist H. J. Eysenck stated that a simple 10 minute questionnaire produced better results.

== Awards and recognitions ==
In 1979 Holtzman received the annual award for outstanding contributions to the field of mental health from the Psychiatric Outpatient Centers of America, as well as the Interamerican Psychology Award from the Interamerican Society of Psychology.

As a longtime author, he received the Bruno Klopfer Award in 1988.

In 1995 he received the Award for Distinguished Contributions to the International Advancement of Psychology from the American Psychological Association.

== Selected publications ==
- Holtzman, Wayne H. (1961). Holtzman Inkblot Technique: Guide to Administration and Scoring. Psychological Corporation.
- Holtzman, Wayne H.; Thorpe, Joseph S.; Swartz, Jon D.; Herron, E. Wayne (1961). Inkblot Perception and Personality. Holtzman Inkblot Technique. Hogg Foundation for Mental Health.
- Holtzman, Wayne H.; Brown, William Frank (1964). SSHA Manual: Survey of Study Habits and Attitudes. Psychological Corporation, New York.
- Bischof, Ledford J.; Murphy, Gardner; Holtzman, Wayne H. (1970). Interpreting Personality Theories. Harper & Row. ISBN 9780063560666.
- Holtzman, Wayne H. (1970). COMPUTER-ASSISTED INSTRUCTION, TESTING AND GUIDANCE. Harper & Row.
- Brown, William Frank; Holtzman, Wayne H. (1972). A Guide to College Survival. Prentice-Hall. ISBN 9780133693065.
- Holtzman, Wayne H.; Díaz-Guerrero, Rogelio; Swartz, Jon David; Lara-Tapia, Luis (1975). Personality Development in Two Cultures: A Cross-cultural Longitudinal Study of School Children in Mexico and the United States. University of Texas Press. ISBN 978-0-292-77512-1.
- Holtzman, Wayne H. (1981). Effects of Locally Conducted Research on Policy and Practice Regarding Bilingual Inservice Teacher Education. Southwest Educational Development Laboratory.
- Holtzman, Wayne H. (1983). American Families and Social Policies for Services to Children. Hogg Foundation for Mental Health.
- Swartz, Jon David; Reinehr, Robert C.; Holtzman, Wayne H. (1983). Holtzman Inkblot Technique, 1956-1982: An Annotated Bibliography. Hogg Foundation for Mental Health.
- Holtzman, Wayne H. (1992). School of the Future. American Psychological Association and Hogg Foundation for Mental Health, the University of Texas. ISBN 9780943463117.
- Swartz, Jon David; Reinehr, Robert C.; Holtzman, Wayne H. (1999). Holtzman Inkblot Technique: Research Guide and Bibliography. Hogg Foundation for Mental Health.
