= Blacky pictures test =

Psychological test

The Blacky pictures test was a projective test, employing a series of twelve picture cards, used by psychoanalysts in mid-20th century America and elsewhere, to investigate the extent to which children's personalities were shaped by Freudian psychosexual development.

The test was created by Gerald S. Blum in 1947, who was later Professor of Psychology at the University of Michigan. The drawings depicted a family of cartoon dogs in normal situations which could be related to psychoanalytic theory. The main character, "Blacky", was accompanied by a sibling Tippy, and by a mother and father. Blacky's gender was determined by the gender of the test subject.

Children were asked to make up a story, based in the drawings in the pictures, and the content of their responses, when analysed, was thought to indicate the extent of Freudian personality traits, such as an anal personality, castration anxiety or penis envy.

The Blacky Pictures Test's worth as a source of useful data was questioned by psychologists, among them Hans Eysenck, and they since have fallen out of use.

== Background ==
Sigmund Freud (1856– 1939), the "father of psychoanalysis", is well known for his theory of psychosexual development, which has had a lasting effect on the field. He became interested in the psychosexual development of children and constructed five stages of development: oral, anal, phallic, latency, and genital.

In his early research, Freud approached the treatment of hysteria through a free association technique in which patients simply let their mind wander freely, reporting all thoughts, feelings or memories that came to mind. A self-analysis, following the death of his father, led Freud to develop a theory of childhood sexuality. Through his own free associations, he recovered a childhood dream in which he had wished for the death of his father and sexual desires for his mother. This led to his discovery of what he called the Oedipus complex, in which there exists a strong sexual desire for the opposite-sexed parent and major attitudes of rivalry for the same-sexed parent.

This phenomenon appears in both sexes during the phallic stage of development. As a boy's feelings for his mother intensifies, castration anxiety develops because he sees his father as a dominant figure and fears he will be castrated for his inappropriate desires for his mother. This phenomenon also occurs in girls, and is referred to by some as the Electra complex. The girl develops penis envy, realizing she does not have one and these feelings make her reject her mother and desire her father. All of these inappropriate feelings eventually lead to an inner conflict that is resolved only by identification with the same-sex parent. Freud's theory of psychosexual development eventually led to the invention of a theoretically-derived test.

Gerald Blum created the Blacky Pictures Test in 1947, when there were hopes of discovering deeper knowledge of changes in personality as psychosexual development advances. Each of the 12 cartoons used in the test illustrates either a different stage of psychosexual development or an object relationship using four main characters: Blacky, Mama, Papa and Tippy. Dogs were used in the cartoons, instead of humans, to avoid possible inhibition. Dogs have appeared as characters in Disney film productions and comic strips, and so child participants are able to identify with the characters enough to express their true feelings.

In a typical test session, the subject is asked to examine the picture and tell a story about it. The subject is then asked a series of short-answer and multiple-choice questions about his or her understanding of the cartoons. Finally, he or she is asked to rate their preference for the cartoons shown. Blacky represents the "son" to male subjects and the "daughter" to female subjects. An objective scoring system is then used to rate responses. Results are analyzed and interpreted to find that the subject has a "strong" personality type such as anal, oral or phallic, corresponding to one of the psychosexual development stages.

== Uses, research and results ==
When the Blacky Pictures were first created in 1947, their main purpose was to help the analyst understand the changes in a child's personality as he or she progressed through the Freudian stages of psychosexual development. The Blacky Pictures were shown by a psychoanalyst to a patient and the subject's reactions were analyzed in relation to the Freudian personality traits. Subjects were rated on a variety of dimensions, including oral eroticism, oral sadism, castration anxiety, sibling rivalry, positive ego identification and narcissistic love object. Blacky Pictures have been used to diagnose various psychological or psychiatric problems in both children and adults.

In the years after they were first established, Blacky Pictures were investigated by various researchers such as Blum and Kaufman and Bernstein and Chase. The results, however, from the various strands of research are ambiguous. For instance, Blum and Kaufman found a significant difference in oral eroticism between groups. When the study was replicated by Bernstein and Chase, however, no differences between the groups was found.

== Validity and reliability ==
In 1950 several studies found results from the analysis of Blacky Pictures consistent with Freudian psychoanalytic theory, providing some support for the construct validity of the test. Experimental techniques found that Blacky Pictures were accurate in predicting behavior associated with the psychosexual personality types, in both individual and group settings. Research by Blum and Kaufman, however, brought the validity of the test into question. Furthermore, a lack of differences between groups with different psychological problems was found, questioning the validity of the technique.

When Blacky Pictures first began to be used, the interpretations and conclusions made by examiners appeared to have been consistent across different scorers. Later work highlighted the subjectivity of test scoring. Each psychologist rates different traits with a quantity but this rating is dependent on individual interpretation. Exactly which responses are indicative of a "strong" score is not well-defined. Additionally, the test assumes that denial implies repression, which is hypothetical, rather than proven, theory. Another challenge to validity is that responses and evaluations can have alternative explanations. For instance, differences in responses between subjects may be more consistent with an introverted or extraverted personality, rather than with an anal personality type.

== Current use ==
After several years of limited use, Blacky Pictures began to be disregarded as a legitimate tool for analysis and eventually fell out of use altogether. They are now often regarded as inconclusive and unreliable.

== See also ==
- Holtzman Inkblot Test
- Picture Arrangement Test
- Rorschach test
- Thematic Apperception Test
