= Patt (disambiguation) =

Yale Nance Patt is an American professor of electrical and computer engineering at The University of Texas at Austin.

Patt may also refer to:

People

- Avram Patt, Vermont politician
- Harvey M. Patt (1918–1982), American physiologist, radiobiologist, and cell biologist
- Iddo Patt, filmmaker and television advertiser

Other

- Party All the Time, a song sometimes referred to as "PATT"
- Trentino Tyrolean Autonomist Party (Partito Autonomista Trentino Tirolese)
