= Kinetic family drawing =

Technique for childhood psychology assessments

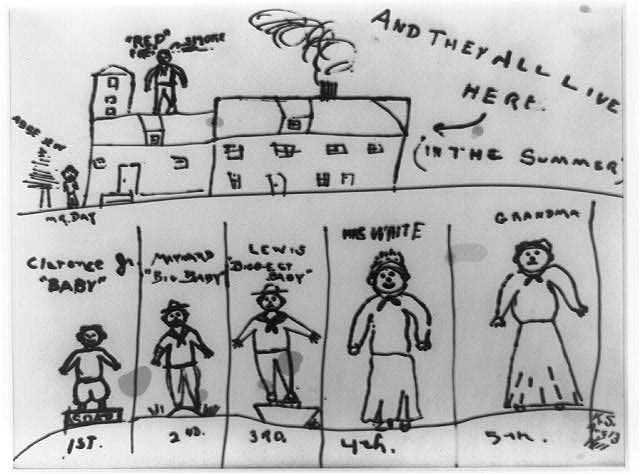
Child's drawing of the Clarence White family.

Figure drawings are projective diagnostic techniques in which an individual is instructed to draw a person, an object or a situation so that cognitive, interpersonal, or psychological functioning can be assessed. The Kinetic Family Drawing, developed in 1970 by Burns and Kaufman, represents the class of Draw-the- Family-Tests (DFT) initially proposed by Corman in 1960s to screen for attachment patterns in children 5–15 years of age and for general family dynamics.

The DFT normally requires the test-taker to draw a picture of his or her entire family. Children are asked to draw a picture of their family, including themselves. In comparison to classic DFT, simply asking a child to draw a family on a piece of paper, the Kinetic family drawing ask children to draw family members "doing something." This picture, like any DFT, also means to elicit the child's attitudes toward his or her family and the overall family dynamics.

Interpretations of projective tests are subjective in nature. The limitations of projective tests should be considered. It is generally a good idea to use projective tests as part of an overall test battery.

== Method ==
Despite the flexibility in administration and interpretation of figure drawings, these tests require skilled and trained administrators familiar with both the theory behind the tests and the structure of the tests themselves. The KFD involves the examiner instructing the child to draw a picture of themselves, and everyone in his or her family, doing something. The examiner may then ask the child questions about the drawing, such as what is happening and who is in the picture. Certain characteristics of the drawing are noted upon analysis, such as the placement of family members; the absence of any members; whether the figures are relatively consistent with reality or altered by the child; the absence of particular body parts; erasures; elevated figures; and so on. The KFD can be administered as part of an assessment battery examining possible child abuse.

The KFD was created as an extension of the Family Drawing Test (Burns & Kaufman, 1972). The kinetic aspect refers to the instructions given to the child to draw his or her family members doing something.

The KFD is similar to other psychometric projective techniques such as the Draw-A-Person Test developed by Machover and the House-Tree-Person (HTP) technique developed by Buck.

== See also ==
- Draw-A-Person test
- House-Tree-Person test
