= Aminobutyraldehyde dehydrogenase =

Class of enzymes

aminobutyraldehyde dehydrogenase

Identifiers
- EC no.: 1.2.1.19
- CAS no.: 9028-98-2

Databases
- IntEnz: IntEnz view
- BRENDA: BRENDA entry
- ExPASy: NiceZyme view
- KEGG: KEGG entry
- MetaCyc: metabolic pathway
- PRIAM: profile
- PDB structures: RCSB PDB PDBe PDBsum
- Gene Ontology: AmiGO / QuickGO
Search
- PMC: articles
- PubMed: articles
- NCBI: proteins

In enzymology, aminobutyraldehyde dehydrogenase (EC 1.2.1.19) is an enzyme that catalyzes the chemical reaction

4-Aminobutanal
+ NAD^{+}
H_{2}O
H^{+}
H_{2}O
H^{+}
γ-Aminobutyric acid
+ NADH

The three substrates of this enzyme are 4-aminobutanal, oxidised nicotinamide adenine dinucleotide (NAD^{+}), and water. Its products are γ-aminobutyric acid, reduced NADH, and a proton.

This enzyme belongs to the family of oxidoreductases, specifically those acting on the aldehyde or oxo group of donor with NAD+ or NADP+ as acceptor. The systematic name of this enzyme class is 4-aminobutanal:NAD+ 1-oxidoreductase. Other names in common use include gamma-guanidinobutyraldehyde dehydrogenase (ambiguous), ABAL dehydrogenase, 4-aminobutyraldehyde dehydrogenase, 4-aminobutanal dehydrogenase, gamma-aminobutyraldehyde dehydrogenase, 1-pyrroline dehydrogenase, ABALDH, and YdcW. This enzyme participates in the urea cycle and the metabolism of amino groups and beta-alanine.
