= 4-Aminobutanal =

Metabolic intermediate

Names
- Preferred IUPAC name 4-Aminobutanal
- Other names γ-Aminobutyraldehyde; gamma-Aminobutyraldehyde; 4-Aminobutyraldehyde; GABA aldehyde

Identifiers
CAS Number	4390-05-0
3D model (JSmol)	Interactive image
ChEBI	CHEBI:17769
ChEMBL	ChEMBL2261442
ChemSpider	115
KEGG	C00555
PubChem CID	118
UNII	VTX8N8R7G2
- InChI: InChI=1S/C4H9NO/c5-3-1-2-4-6/h4H,1-3,5H2 Key: DZQLQEYLEYWJIB-UHFFFAOYSA-N
- SMILES: C(CC=O)CN

Properties
Chemical formula	C_{4}H_{9}NO
Molar mass	87.122 g·mol^{−1}
- Except where otherwise noted, data are given for materials in their standard state (at 25 °C [77 °F], 100 kPa). Infobox references

4-Aminobutanal, also known as γ-aminobutyraldehyde, 4-aminobutyraldehyde, or GABA aldehyde, is a metabolite of putrescine and a biological precursor of γ-aminobutyric acid (GABA). It can be converted into GABA by the actions of diamine oxidase (DAO) and aminobutyraldehyde dehydrogenase (ABALDH) (e.g., ALDH9A1). Putrescine is converted into 4-aminobutanal via monoamine oxidase B (MAO-B). However, biosynthesis of GABA from polyamines like putrescine is a minor metabolic pathway in the brain.

The related compound γ-hydroxybutyraldehyde (GHBAL) is a prodrug of γ-hydroxybutyric acid (GHB) as well as a metabolic intermediate in the conversion of 1,4-butanediol (1,4-BD) into GHB. However, aliphatic aldehydes like GHBAL are caustic, strong-smelling, and foul-tasting, and ingestion is likely to be unpleasant and result in severe nausea and vomiting.

== See also ==
- N-Acetyl-γ-aminobutyraldehyde (N-acetyl-GABAL)
