= Picture arrangement test =

Test often used in measures of intelligence

Picture arrangement test is a test that consists of a series of comic-strip-like pictures that are presented in a random order. The subject is given the task to arrange the pictures as quickly as possible so that a reasonable and meaningful story is formed. This is an example of a common feature found in intelligence tests. As the demand for psychological testing has increased, this type has seen increased use throughout Psychology. There are several different ways and scales that can be used with this test to measure different kind of intelligence. Different tests over time have been created to measure different things. One scale that has been developed and used with these tests has been the Wechsler Adult Intelligence Scale which breaks down ones full performance IQ into subsets like verbal IQ and performance IQ, getting more specific and elaborate as the scale for each individual develops. The reliability of this test has been disputed, however. For example, patients with schizophrenia have been found to score as more "normal" than patients with no such mental disorders.

== Historical overview ==
An article in 1917 written by Alida Bowler talked about the picture arrangement test designed to measure logical judgments that was tried by Dr. O. Decroly with five hundred school children in Brussels. His material consisted of eleven series of pictures taken from children's books, each series tell a complete simple story when arranged in the right order. The series are given to the child in a random order and requested that the child arrange them in a way that they tell a continuous story. His aim was to find series that adapted to different ages and he concluded that series of such tests will approximately indicate the mental age of who takes the test. In 1915, Alida and her co-examiners obtained copies of the "Foxy Grandpa" picture series which has a total of fifteen series with each story containing six scenes. The results of the experiment is described in the article and six-picture series were dropped from the original fifteen for various reasons not specified in the article.

In 1939, David Wechsler realized the limitation of the Stanford-Binet and designed an intellect by tapping a diverse sample of capabilities. In earlier methods of assessment, Weschler devised the format that we currently known as the Wechsler scales, consisting of a collection of subsets. He believed in the unitary nature of intelligence but subscribed to the idea that intellect can be best measured through interdependent, qualitatively different abilities. Historical, the picture arrangement subsets of the Wechsler scales have been characterized repeatedly as being nonverbal and verbal measure of social competence. For this reason, clinicians interpret performance on the picture arrangement subsets as measures of social ability. Although picture arrangement (PA) has been viewed as predictive of social intelligence, there has been considerable difficulty defining social intelligence, social functioning and/or social competence. Wechsler believed that general intelligence could be applied to all situations. Thus, "social" intelligence might best be conceptualized as one aspect of general intelligence.

Thorndike (1920) described social intelligence as the ability to understand others and "act wisely in human relations". He proposed that social intelligence was itself an aspect of a person's IQ. More recent authors within the intelligence literature have also attempted to define social intelligence but have not succeeded in clarifying the concept.

== Weschler's Picture Arrangement (PA) Subset ==
The PA subset includes "a set of colorful pictures, presented in a mixed-up order, which the child rearranges into a logical story sequence". This subset is thought to measure the child's ability to anticipate the consequences of initial acts or situations, as well as the ability to interpret social situations. It is widely assumed that the PA subset measure a person's ability to evaluate and comprehend a situation using pictorial cues that have been visually organized. When performance is poor, it is suspected that the client may have an impaired capacity to reflect, anticipate, and plan a course of action, and to understand antecedent and consequent events. Since the PA items typically involve human or practical situations, it is also thought that a person with a high PA score is adept at sizing up and comprehending social situations. For example, it was common to attribute the high PA score found for adults diagnostically classified as narcissistic to their "Characteristically facile social anticipation". Furthermore, adults with psychopathic character disorders frequently have a very high PA score, especially the "shrewd schemer" who can quickly evaluate a situation and manipulate it for his/her own end.

=== Tomkins-Horn Picture Arrangement test ===
The Tomkins-Horn Picture Arrangement test was conducted and created by Silvan Tomkins and Daniel Horn at the Harvard Psychology Clinic in 1942 as a subset the Wechsler intelligence scales, wherein the involved party must appropriately order a sequence of sketches which tell a short story in a very similar manner to the PAT developed by Tomkins and Horn. The PAT was inspired by The Thematic Apperception test and was developed to "maximize the ease of administration and the scoring at the least cost in richness of projective material". It was also developed for group testing and machine scoring. The test is designed to be given in random order to the subject where the subject is presented with a series of cards in an incorrect order that must be placed in the correct order to tell a story that makes sense. The stories are like short comic strips and placing them in order relies on the individual's ability to recognize the cause and effect relationship of events depicted in the cards. This task gives information about an individual's reasoning abilities, and performance is related to the ability to understand precursors and consequences of events. The pictures on the cards involve human characters and interactions and there are different keys which have been pre-determined. The subject tell matches a key which then gives information about the subject's intelligence and mental state.

The PAT developed by Silvan Tomkins and Daniel Horn had 25 plates each consisting of line drawings of three situation that were different but related. Each plate, and all 25 plates depicted a common "hero" in all the situations presented. It was the subject's task to specify in what order the three situations should be placed to make the most reasonable story. The Tomkins-Horn Picture Arrangement Test was changed to The Tomkins-Horn Picture Arrangement Experiment by the Public Opinion Surveys who believed that samples could be easily obtained when the term "experiment" is used instead of "test". The interpretation of the test was not fixed; Silvan Tomkins and Daniel Horn stated that there are always alternate possible interpretations for any rare response in terms of content and in respect to the psychological level involved. The PAT was not developed to differentiate the different levels of psychological levels with respect to all content areas.

== See also ==
- Rorschach test
- Microexpression
- Blacky pictures test
