= Projective test =

Type of personality test

Projective tests
- MeSH: D011386

In psychology, a projective test is a personality test designed to let a person respond to ambiguous stimuli, presumably revealing hidden emotions and internal conflicts projected by the person into the test. This is sometimes contrasted with a so-called "objective test" / "self-report test", which adopt a "structured" approach as responses are analyzed according to a presumed universal standard (for example, a multiple choice exam), and are limited to the content of the test. The responses to projective tests are content analyzed for meaning rather than being based on presuppositions about meaning, as is the case with objective tests. Projective tests have their origins in psychoanalysis, which argues that humans have conscious and unconscious attitudes and motivations that are beyond or hidden from conscious awareness.

According to Luis A. Cordón, "At present, it is clear that projective tests fail to meet even the most basic standards of reliability and validity."

== Theory ==
The general theoretical position behind projective tests is that whenever a specific question is asked, the response will be consciously formulated and socially determined. These responses do not reflect the respondent's unconscious or implicit attitudes or motivations. The respondent's deep-seated motivations may not be consciously recognized by the respondent or the respondent may not be able to verbally express them in the form and structure demanded by the questioner. Advocates of projective tests stress that the ambiguity of the stimuli presented within the tests allow subjects to express thoughts that originate on a deeper level than tapped by explicit questions, and provide content that may not be captured by responsive tools that lacks appropriate items. After some decrease in interest in the 1980s and 1990s, newer research suggesting that implicit motivation is best captured in this way has increased the research and use of these tools.

== Projective hypothesis ==
This holds that an individual puts structure on an ambiguous situation in a way that is consistent with their own conscious and unconscious needs. It is an indirect method- testee is talking about something that comes spontaneously from the self without conscious awareness or editing.

- Reduces temptation to fake
- Does not depend as much on verbal abilities
- Taps both conscious and unconscious traits
- Focus is clinical perspective - not normative - but has developed norms over the years

== Common variants ==
=== Rorschach ===
The best known and most frequently used projective test is the Rorschach inkblot test. This test was originally developed in 1921 to diagnose schizophrenia. Subjects are shown a series of ten irregular but symmetrical inkblots, and asked to explain what they see. The subject's responses are then analyzed in various ways, noting not only what was said, but the time taken to respond, which aspect of the drawing was focused on, and how individual responses compared to other responses for the same drawing. It is important that the Rorschach test and other projective tests be conducted by experienced professionals to ensure validity and consistency of results. The Rorschach was commonly scored using the Comprehensive System (CS), until the development of the newer scoring system, the Rorschach Performance Assessment System (R-PAS) in 2011. In an influential review, the Rorschach Inkblot Test using the CS method has been labeled as a "problematic instrument" in terms of its psychometric properties.

The new scoring system has stronger psychometric properties than the CS, and, like the CS, allows for a standardized administration of the test which is something that is lacking in a majority of projective measures. Additional psychometric strengths present with the R-PAS include updated normative data. The norms from the CS were updated to also include protocols from 15 other countries, resulting in updated international norms. The CS international norm data set was based on fewer countries, most of which were European only. The new international norms provide a better representation of the Western hemisphere and westernized countries. Concerning differences in administration of the task across both scoring systems, a critical issue with CS administration was addressed in the development of the R-PAS. Following CS administration procedure, it was common to obtain too few or too many responses per card which could result in an invalidated protocol (due to too few responses) or in error. The new administration procedure introduced in the R-PAS requires the clinician to initially tell the examinee that they should provide two or three responses per card, and allows the clinician to prompt for additional responses if too few are given, or to pull cards away if too many are given. Therefore, the new administration procedure addresses the critical issue of number of responses that was prevalent with use of the CS administration procedure. The CS administration procedure prevented clinicians from prompting for more responses or pulling cards when too many responses were provided. An additional psychometric improvement concerns the presentation of obtained scores. With the R-PAS system, it is now possible to change scores to percentiles and convert percentiles to standard scores which can be presented visually and allow for easy comparison to the normative data. With the CS, this was not possible and it was more difficult to compare results to normative comparison groups. Lastly, the R-PAS scores have been shown to possess similar and sometimes stronger inter-rater reliability than was seen in scores from the CS. This means that when different clinicians score the same protocol, they are quite likely to derive the same interpretations and scores.

=== Holtzman Inkblot Test ===
This is a variation of the Rorschach test, but uses a much larger pool of different images. Its main differences lie in its objective scoring criteria as well as limiting subjects to one response per inkblot (to avoid variable response productivity). Different variables such as reaction time are scored for an individual's response upon seeing an inkblot.

=== Thematic apperception test ===
Another popular projective test is the Thematic Apperception Test (TAT) in which an individual views ambiguous scenes of people, and is asked to describe various aspects of the scene; for example, the subject may be asked to describe what led up to this scene, the emotions of the characters, and what might happen afterwards. A clinician will evaluate these descriptions, attempting to discover the conflicts, motivations and attitudes of the respondent. A researcher may use a specific scoring system that establishes consistent criteria of expressed thoughts and described behaviors associated with a specific trait, e.g., the need for Achievement, which has a validated and reliable scoring system. In the answers, the respondent "projects" their unconscious attitudes and motivations into the picture, which is why these are referred to as "projective tests." Although the TAT is a commonly used psychological assessment instrument, its validity as a personality assessment test has been questioned. In contrast, it has high reliability and validity when used in research with larger samples.

=== Draw-A-Person test ===
The Draw-A-Person test requires the subject to draw a person. The results are based on a psychodynamic interpretation of the details of the drawing, such as the size, shape and complexity of the facial features, clothing and background of the figure. As with other projective tests, the approach has very little demonstrated validity and there is evidence that therapists may attribute pathology to individuals who are merely poor artists. A popular review has concluded that its scientific status "can best be declared as weak". A similar class of techniques is kinetic family drawing.

=== Animal Metaphor Test ===
The Animal Metaphor test consists of a series of creative and analytical prompts in which the person filling out the test is asked to create a story and then interpret its personal significance. Unlike conventional projective tests, the Animal Metaphor Test works as both a diagnostic and therapeutic battery. Unlike the Rorschach test and TAT, the Animal Metaphor is premised on self-analysis via self-report questions. The test combines facets of art therapy, cognitive behavioral therapy, and insight therapy, while also providing a theoretical platform of behavioral analysis. The test has been used widely as a clinical tool, as an educational assessment, and in human resource selection. The test is accompanied by an inventory, The Relational Modality Evaluation Scale, a self-report measure that targets individuals' particular ways of resolving conflict and ways of dealing with relational stress. These tests were developed by Dr. Albert J Levis at the Center for the Study of Normative Behavior in Hamden, CT, a clinical training and research center.

=== Sentence completion test ===
Sentence completion tests require the subject to complete sentence "stems" with their own words. The subject's response is considered to be a projection of their conscious and/or unconscious attitudes, personality characteristics, motivations, and beliefs. However, there is evidence that sentence completion tests elicit learned associations rather than unconscious attitudes. Thus, respondents answer "black" when presented with the word, "white," or "father" when presented with the word "mother," according to Soley and Smith.

=== Picture Arrangement Test ===
Created by Silvan Tomkins, this psychological test consists of 25 sets of 3 pictures which the subject must arrange into a sequence that they "feel makes the best sense". The reliability of this test has been disputed, however. For example, patients with schizophrenia have been found to score as more "normal" than patients with no such mental disorders. Other picture tests include:

- Thompson version
- CAT (animals) and CAT-H (humans)
- Senior AT
- Blacky pictures test - dogs
- Picture Story Test - adolescents
- Education Apperception Test -attitudes towards learning
- Michigan Picture Test - children 8–14
- TEMAS - Hispanic children
- Make-A-Picture-Story (MAPS) - make own pictures from figures, 6 years and older

=== Word Association Test ===
Word association testing is a technique developed by Carl Jung to explore complexes in the personal unconscious. Jung came to recognize the existence of groups of thoughts, feelings, memories, and perceptions, organized around a central theme, that he termed psychological complexes. This discovery was related to his research into word association, a technique whereby words presented to patients elicit other word responses that reflect related concepts in the patients' psyche, thus providing clues to their unique psychological make-up

=== Graphology ===
Graphology is the pseudoscientific analysis of the physical characteristics and patterns of handwriting purporting to be able to identify the writer, indicating psychological state at the time of writing, or evaluating personality characteristics.

Graphology has been controversial for more than a century. Although supporters point to the anecdotal evidence of positive testimonials as a reason to use it for personality evaluation, most empirical studies fail to show the validity claimed by its supporters.

The Teste Palográfico (Palographic Test) is a personality test used frequently in Brazil.

== Validity ==
Projective tests are criticized from the perspective of statistical validity and psychometrics. Most of the supporting studies on the validity of projective tests are poor or outdated. Proponents of projective tests claim there is a discrepancy between statistical validity and clinical validity.

In the case of clinical use, they rely heavily on clinical judgment, lack statistical reliability and statistical validity and many have no standardized criteria to which results may be compared, however this is not always the case. These tests are used frequently, though the scientific evidence is sometimes debated. There have been many empirical studies based on projective tests (including the use of standardized norms and samples), particularly more established tests. The criticism of lack of scientific evidence to support them and their continued popularity has been referred to as the "projective paradox".

Responding to the statistical criticism of his projective test, Leopold Szondi said that his test actually discovers "fate and existential possibilities hidden in the inherited familial unconscious and the personal unconscious, even those hidden because never lived through or because have been rejected. Is any statistical method able to span, understand and integrate mathematically all these possibilities? I deny this categorically."

Other research, however, has established that projective tests measure things that responsive tests do not, though it is theoretically possible to combine the two, e.g., Spangler, 1992. Decades of works by advocates, e.g., David C. McClelland, David Winter, Abigail Stewart, and, more recently, Oliver Schultheiss, have shown clear validity for these tools for certain personality traits, most especially implicit motivation (as contrasted with self-attributed or "explicit" motivation, which are conscious states), and that criticisms of projective tools based on techniques used for responsive tools is simply an inappropriate method of measurement. Moreover, Soley and Smith report that when used with larger Ns in research, as opposed to the clinical assessment of an individual, projective tests can exhibit high validity and reliability.

== Concerns ==
=== Assumptions ===
- The more unstructured the stimuli, the more examinees reveal about their personality.
- Projection is greater to stimulus material that is similar to the examinee
- There is an "unconscious."
- Subjects are unaware of what they disclose
- Provides information about personality that is not obtainable through self-report measures
- Subjects are projecting their personality onto the ambiguous stimuli they are interpreting

=== Situation Variables ===
- Age of examiner
- Specific instructions
- Subtle reinforcement cues
- Setting/privacy

== Terminology ==
In 2006 the terms "objective test" and "projective test" came under criticism in the Journal of Personality Assessment. The more descriptive "rating scale or self-report measures" and "free response measures" are suggested, rather than the terms "objective tests" and "projective tests," respectively. Additionally, there are inherent biases implied in the terminology itself. For example, when individuals use the term "objective" to describe a test, it is assumed that the test possess accuracy and precision. Conversely, when the term "projective" is used to describe a test, it is assumed that these measures are less accurate. Neither of these assumptions are fully accurate, and have led researchers to develop alternative terminology to describe various projective measures. For example, it has been proposed that the Rorschach be labeled as a "behavioral task" due to its ability to provide an in vivo or real life sample of human behavior. It is easy to forget that both objective and projective tests are capable of producing objective data, and both require some form of subjective interpretation from the examiner. Objective testing, such as self-report measures, like the MMPI-2, require objective responses from the examinee and subjective interpretations from the examiner. Projective testing, such as the Rorschach, requires subjective responses from the examinee, and can in theory involve objective (actuarial) interpretation.

== Uses in marketing ==
Projective techniques, including TATs, are used in qualitative marketing research, for example to help identify potential associations between brand images and the emotions they may provoke. In advertising, projective tests are used to evaluate responses to advertisements. The tests have also been used in management to assess achievement motivation and other drives, to assess the adoption of innovations. The application of responses is different in these disciplines than in psychology, because the responses of multiple respondents are grouped together for analysis by the organisation commissioning the research, rather than interpreting the meaning of the responses given by a single subject.

== Uses in business ==
Projective techniques are used extensively in people assessment; besides variants of the TAT, which are used to identify implicit motive patterns, the Behavioral Event Interview pioneered by American psychologist David McClelland and many of its related approaches (such as the Critical Incident Interview, the Behavioral Interview, and so on) is fundamentally a projective tool in that it invites someone to tell a specific story about recent actions they took, but does not ask leading questions or questions with yes or no answers.

== See also ==
- Albert J. Levis
- Blacky Pictures Test
- Bruno Klopfer
- Ernest Dichter
- Holtzman inkblot technique
- Pareidolia
- The Duess Test
- Identification Projection Series

== Footnotes ==
- Theodor W. Adorno, et al. (1964). The Authoritarian Personality. New York: John Wiley & Sons.
