= Thematic Apperception Test =

Projective psychological test

- MeSH: D013803

The Thematic Apperception Test (TAT) is a projective psychological test developed during the 1930s by Henry A. Murray and Christiana D. Morgan at Harvard University. Proponents of the technique assert that subjects' responses, in the narratives they make up about ambiguous pictures of people, reveal their underlying motives, concerns, and the way they see the social world. Historically, the test has been among the most widely researched, taught, and used of such techniques.

== History ==
The TAT was developed by American psychologist Murray and lay psychoanalyst Morgan at the Harvard Clinic at Harvard University during the 1930s. Anecdotally, the idea for the TAT emerged from a question asked by one of Murray's undergraduate students, Cecilia Roberts. She reported that when her son was ill, he spent the day making up stories about images in magazines and she asked Murray if pictures could be employed in a clinical setting to explore the underlying dynamics of personality.

Murray wanted to use a measure that would reveal information about the whole person but found the contemporary tests of his time lacking in this regard. Therefore, he created the TAT. The rationale behind the technique is that people tend to interpret ambiguous situations in accordance with their own past experiences and current motivations, which may be conscious or unconscious. Murray reasoned that by asking people to tell a story about a picture, their defenses to the examiner would be lowered as they would not realize the sensitive personal information they were divulging by creating the story.

Murray and Morgan spent the 1930s selecting pictures from illustrative magazines and developing the test. After 3 versions of the test (Series A, Series B, and Series C), Morgan and Murray decided on the final set of pictures, Series D, which remains in use today. Although she was given first authorship on the first published paper about the TAT in 1935, Morgan did not receive authorship credit on the final published instrument. Reportedly, her role in the creation of the TAT was primarily in the selection and editing of the images, but due to the primacy of the name on the original publication the majority of written inquiries about the TAT were addressed to her; since most of these letters included questions that she could not answer, she requested that her name be removed from future authorship.

During the time Murray was developing the TAT he was also involved in Herman Melville studies. The therapeutic technique originally came to him from the "Doubloon chapter" in Moby Dick. In this chapter, multiple characters inspect the same image (a Doubloon), but each character has vastly different interpretations of the imagery—Ahab sees symbols of himself in the coin, while the religiously devout Starbuck sees the Christian Trinity. Other characters provide interpretations of the image that give more insight into the characters themselves based on their interpretations of the imagery. Crew members, including Ahab, project their self perceptions onto the coin which was nailed to the mast. Murray, a lifelong Melvillist, often maintained that all of Melville's oeuvre was for him a TAT.

After World War II, the TAT was adopted more broadly by psychoanalysts and clinicians to evaluate emotionally disturbed patients. Later, in the 1970s, the Human Potential Movement encouraged psychologists to use the TAT to help their clients understand themselves better and stimulate personal growth. In the 1950s the TAT was widely used to support assessment of needs and motives.

== Procedure ==
The TAT is popularly known as the picture interpretation technique because it uses a series of provocative yet ambiguous pictures about which the subject is asked to tell a story. The TAT manual provides the administration instructions used by Murray, although these procedures are commonly altered. The subject is asked to tell as dramatic a story as they can for each picture presented, including the following:

- what has led up to the event shown
- what is happening at the moment
- what the characters are feeling and thinking
- what the outcome of the story was

If these elements are omitted, particularly for children or individuals of low cognitive abilities, the evaluator may ask the subject about them directly. Otherwise, the examiner is to avoid interjecting and should not answer questions about the content of the pictures. The examiner records stories verbatim for later interpretation.

The complete version of the test contains 32 picture cards. Some of the cards show male figures, some female, some both male and female figures, some of ambiguous gender, some adults, some children, and some show no human figures at all. One card is completely blank and is used to elicit both a scene and a story about the given scene from the storyteller. Although the cards were originally designed to be matched to the subject in terms of age and gender, any card may be used with any subject. Murray hypothesized that stories would yield better information about a client if the majority of cards administered featured a character similar in age and gender to the client.

Although Murray recommended using 20 cards, most practitioners choose a set of between 8 and 12 selected cards, either using cards that they feel are generally useful, or that they believe will encourage the subject's expression of emotional conflicts relevant to their specific history and situation. However, the examiner should aim to select a variety of cards in order to get a more global perspective of the storyteller and to avoid confirmation bias (i.e., finding only what you are looking for).

Many of the TAT drawings consist of sets of themes such as: success and failure, competition and jealousy, feeling about relationships, aggression, and sexuality. These are usually depicted through picture cards.

== Psychometric characteristics ==
Thematic apperception tests are meant to evoke an involuntary display of one's subconscious. There is no standardization for evaluating one's TAT responses; each evaluation is completely subjective because each response is unique. Validity and reliability are, consequently, the largest question marks of the TAT. There are trends and patterns, which help identify psychological traits, but there are no distinct responses to indicate different conditions a patient may or may not have. Medical professionals most commonly use it in the early stages of patient treatment. The TAT helps professionals identify a broad range of issues that their patients may suffer from. Even when individual scoring procedures are examined, the absence of standardization or norms make it difficult to compare the results of validity and reliability research across studies. Specifically, even studies using the same scoring system often use different cards, or a different number of cards. Standardization is also absent amongst clinicians, who often alter the instructions and procedures. Murstein explained that different cards may be more or less useful for specific clinical questions and purposes, making the use of one set of cards for all clients impractical.

=== Reliability ===
Internal consistency, a reliability estimate focusing on how highly test items correlate to each other, is often quite low for TAT scoring systems. Some authors have argued that internal consistency measures do not apply to the TAT. In contrast to traditional test items, which should all measure the same construct and be correlated to each other, each TAT card represents a different situation and should yield highly different response themes. Lilienfeld and colleagues countered this point by questioning the practice of compiling TAT responses to form scores. Both inter-rater reliability (the degree to which different raters score TAT responses the same) and test–retest reliability (the degree to which individuals receive the same scores over time) are highly variable across scoring techniques. However, Murray asserted that TAT answers are highly related to internal states such that high test-retest reliability should not be expected. Gruber and Kreuzpointner (2013) developed a new method for calculating internal consistency using categories instead of pictures. As they demonstrated in a mathematical proof, their method provides a better fit for the underlying construction principles of TAT, and also achieved adequate Cronbach's alpha scores up to .84

=== Validity ===
The validity of the TAT, or the degree to which it measures what it is supposed to measure, is low. Jenkins has stated that "the phrase 'validity of the TAT' is meaningless, because validity is specific not to the pictures, but to the set of scores derived from the population, purpose, and circumstances involved in any given data collection." That is, the validity of the test would be ascertained by seeing how clinician's decisions were assisted based on the TAT. Evidence on this front suggests it is a weak guide at best. For example, one study indicated that clinicians classified individuals as clinical or non-clinical at close to chance levels (57% where 50% would be guessing) based on TAT data alone. The same study found that classifications were 88% correct based on MMPI data. Using TAT in addition to the MMPI reduced accuracy to 80%.

=== Alternate considerations ===
Despite the conflicting information about the psychometric characteristics of the TAT, proponents have argued that the TAT should not be judged using traditional standards of reliability and validity. According to Holt, "the TAT is a complex method of assessing people, which does not lend itself to the standard rules of thumb about test standards [. . .]" (p. 101). For example, it has been argued that the purpose of the TAT is to reveal a wide range of personality characteristics and complex, nuanced patterns, as opposed to traditional psychological tests that are designed to measure unitary and narrow constructs. Hibbard and colleagues examined several considerations about traditional views of reliability and validity as they apply to the TAT. First, they noted that traditional views of reliability may limit the validity of a measure (such as occurs with multi-faceted concepts in which characteristics are not necessarily related to each other, but are meaningful in combination). Further, Cronbach's alpha, a commonly used measure of internal consistency, is dependent on the number of items in scale. For the TAT, most scales use only a small number of cards (with each card treated like an item) so alphas would not be expected to be very high. Many clinicians also discount the importance of psychometrics, believing that generalizability of the findings to a given client's situation is more important than generalizing findings to the population.

== Scoring systems ==
When he created the TAT, Murray also developed a scoring system based on his need-press theory of personality. Murray's system involved coding every sentence given for the presence of 28 needs and 20 presses (environmental influences), which were then scored from 1 to 5, based on intensity, frequency, duration, and importance to the plot. However, implementing this scoring system is time-consuming and was not widely used. Rather, examiners have traditionally relied on their clinical intuition to come to conclusions about storytellers.

Although not widely used in the clinical setting, several formal scoring systems have been developed for analyzing TAT stories systematically and consistently. Three common methods that are currently used in research are the: Defense mechanisms manual (DMM)

This assesses three defense mechanisms: denial (least mature), projection (intermediate), and identification (most mature). A person's thoughts and feelings are projected in stories involved.

Social cognition and object relations (SCOR) scale

This assesses four different dimensions of object relations: Complexity of representations of people, affect-tone of relationship paradigms, capacity for emotional investment in relationships and moral standards, and understanding of social causality.

Personal problem-solving system—revised (PPSS-R)

This assesses how people identify, think about and resolve problems through the scoring of thirteen different criteria. This scoring system is useful because theoretically, good problem-solving ability is an indicator of an individual's mental health. Although the TAT is a projective personality technique that is based primarily on the psychoanalytic perspective, the PPSS-R scoring system is designed for clinicians and researchers working from a cognitive behavioral framework. The PPSS-R scoring system has been studied in a wide range of populations, including college students, community residents, jail inmates, university clinic clients, community mental health center clients, and psychiatric day treatment clients. Thus, the PPSS-R scoring system allows clinicians and researchers to assess for problem solving ability and social functioning in many types of people, without being hindered by social desirability effects.

Similar to other scoring systems, with the PPSS-R TAT cards are typically administered individually and examinees' responses are recorded verbatim. Unlike other scoring systems, the PPSS-R only uses six of the 31 TAT cards: 1, 2, 4, 7BM, 10, and 13MF. The PPSS-R provides information about four different areas related to problem solving ability: Story design, story orientation, story solutions, and story resolution. These four areas are assessed by the 13 scoring criteria, 12 of which are rated on a five-point scale that ranges from -1 to 3.

Each of these scoring categories attempts to measure the following information:

- Story design measures the examinee's ability to identify and formulate a problem situation.
- Story orientation assesses the examinee's level of personal control, emotional distress, confidence and motivation.
- Story solutions assesses how impulsive the examinee is. In addition to evaluating the types of problem solutions that are provided, the number of problem solutions that examinees provide for each of the TAT cards is summed.
- Story resolution provides information on the examinee's ability to formulate problem solutions that maximize both short and long-term goals.

Examiners are encouraged to explore information obtained from the TAT stories as hypotheses for testing rather than concrete facts.

== General interpretation ==
Interpretation of the responses varies depending on the examiner and the type of scoring used. It is common that the standard scoring systems are used more in research settings than clinical settings. Individuals can select certain scoring systems if they have the goal to evaluate a specific variable such as motivation, defense mechanisms, achievement, problem-solving skills, etc. If a clinician selects not to use a scoring system, there are some general guidelines that can be utilized. For example, the stories created by the individuals in response to the TAT cards are a combination of three things: the card stimulus, the testing environment, and the personality of the examinee. For each card, the individual must subjectively interpret the pictures which involves the individual taking their own experiences and feelings to create a story. Therefore, it is beneficial to look at the common themes in the stories' content and structure to help make conclusions. Murray states that in the stories built by the person being evaluated there is a hero with whom the subject identifies and to whom he attributes his own motivations. However, there are the characters that interact with this hero, and represent the real social and family environment of the person.

With interpretation of the responses, it is important for the clinician to consider some cautions to verify the information is as accurate as possible. First, the examiner should always be conservative when interpreting responses. It is important to always err on the side of caution instead of making bold conclusions. The examiner should also consider all the data when using the TAT in a testing or evaluative setting. One response should not be given more importance over the other responses. Additionally, the examiner should take the individual's developmental status and cultural background into consideration when examining responses. All of these cautions should be considered when an examiner is using the TAT.

== Criticisms ==
Like other projective techniques, the TAT has been criticized on the basis of poor psychometric properties (see above). Criticisms include that the TAT is unscientific because it cannot be proved to be valid (that it actually measures what it claims to measure), or reliable (that it gives consistent results over time). As stories about the cards are a reflection of both the conscious and unconscious motives of the storyteller, it is difficult to disprove the conclusions of the examiner and to find appropriate behavioral measures that would represent the personality traits under examination. Characteristics of the TAT that make conclusions based on the stories yielded from TAT cards hard to be disproved have been termed "immunizing tactics." These characteristics include the Walter Mitty effect (i.e., the assertion that individuals will exhibit high levels of a given trait in TAT stories that do not match their overt behavior because TAT responses may represent how a person wishes they were, not how they truly are) and the inhibition effect (i.e., the assertion that individuals will not exhibit high levels of a trait in TAT responses because they are repressing that trait). In addition, as the present needs of the storyteller change over time, it is not expected that later stories will produce the same results.

The lack of standardization of the cards given and scoring systems applied is problematic because it makes comparing research on the TAT very difficult. With a dearth of sound evidence and normative samples, it is tough to determine how much useful information can be gathered in this manner.

Some critics of the TAT cards have observed that the characters and environments are dated, even "old-fashioned", creating a "cultural or psycho-social distance" between the patients and the stimuli that makes identifying with them less likely. In specific situations it is even hard to identify with people of opposite gender. Also, in researching the responses of subjects given photographs versus the TAT, researchers found that the TAT cards evoked more "deviant" stories (i.e., more negative) than photographs, leading researchers to conclude that the difference was due to the differences in the characteristics of the images used as stimuli.

In a 2005 dissertation, Matthew Narron, Psy.D. attempted to address these issues by reproducing a Leopold Bellak 10 card set photographically and performing an outcome study. The results concluded that the old TAT elicited answers that included many more specific time references than the new TAT.

== Contemporary applications ==
Despite criticisms, the TAT continues to be used as a tool for research into areas of psychology such as dreams, fantasies, mate selection and what motivates people to choose their occupation. Sometimes it is used in a psychiatric or psychological context to assess personality disorders, thought disorders, in forensic examinations to evaluate crime suspects, or to screen candidates for high-stress occupations. It is also commonly used in routine psychological evaluations, typically without a formal scoring system, as a way to explore emotional conflicts and object relations.

David McClelland and Ruth Jacobs conducted a 12-year longitudinal study of leadership using TAT and found no gender differences in motivational predictors of attained management level. The content analysis, however, "revealed 2 distinct styles of power-related themes that distinguished the successful men from the successful women. The successful male managers were more likely to use reactive power [that is, aggressive] themes while the successful female managers were more likely to use resourceful [that is, nurturing] power themes. Differences between the sexes in the power themes were less pronounced among the managers who had remained in lower levels of management."

== Popular culture ==
Due to the test's earlier popularity within psychology, the TAT has appeared in a wide variety of media:

- The test is also given to the main characters in two widely differing tales about the human mind: A Clockwork Orange (1962) and Daniel Keyes's Flowers for Algernon (1958–1966). Italian poet Edoardo Sanguineti wrote a collection of poetry called T.A.T (1966–1968) that refers to the Test.
- Michael Crichton included the TAT in the battery of tests given to the disturbed main character Harry Benson in his novel The Terminal Man (1972).
- The Thomas Harris novel Red Dragon (1981) includes a scene where the imprisoned psychiatrist and serial killer Dr. Hannibal Lecter mocks a previous attempt to administer the test to him.
- The 2026 crime drama film Unabomber depicts Murray and Morgan administering the test to Ted Kaczynski.

== See also ==
- Blacky pictures test
- Psychological testing
