= Ink =

Liquid or paste that contains pigments or dyes

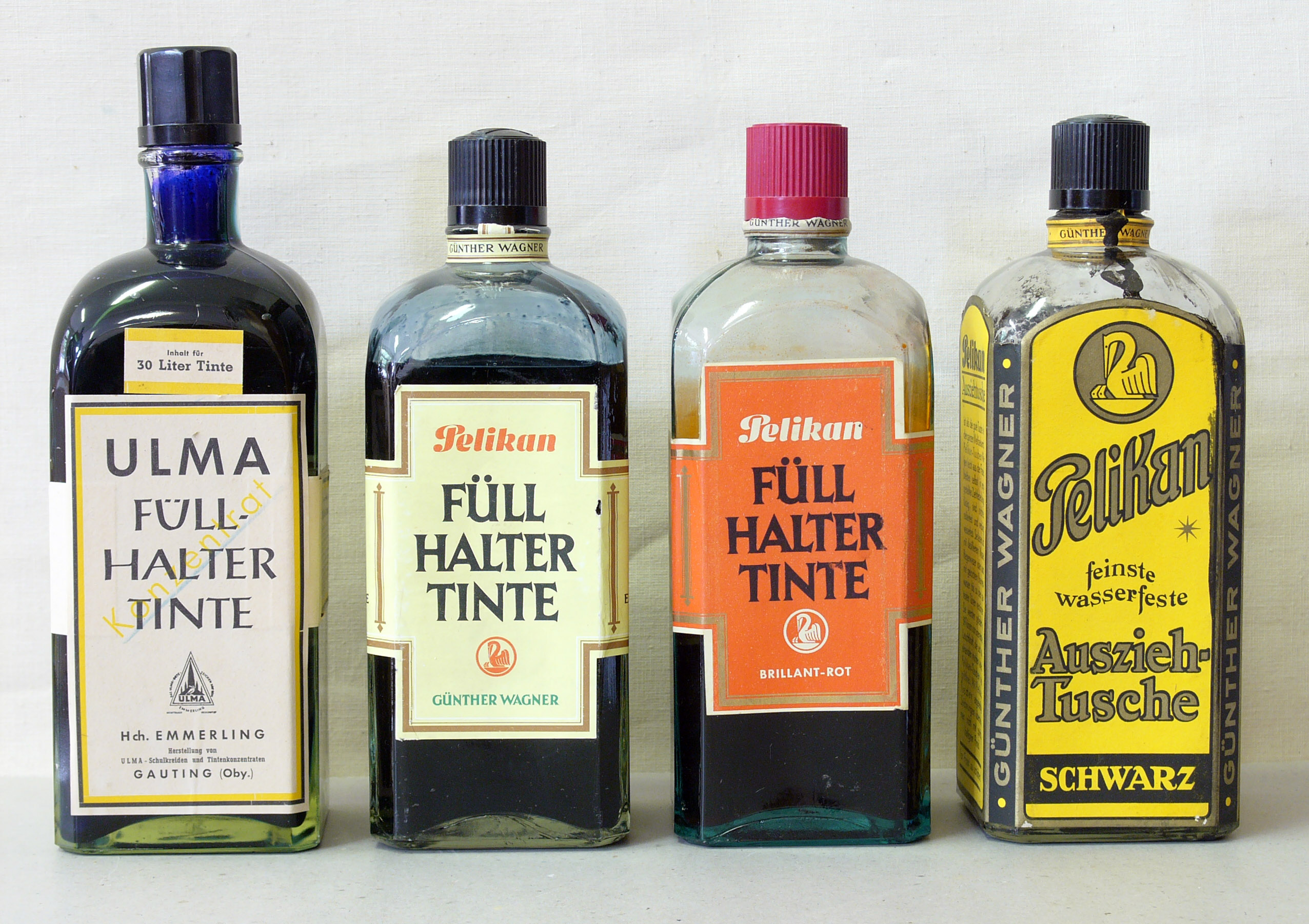
Bottles of ink from Germany

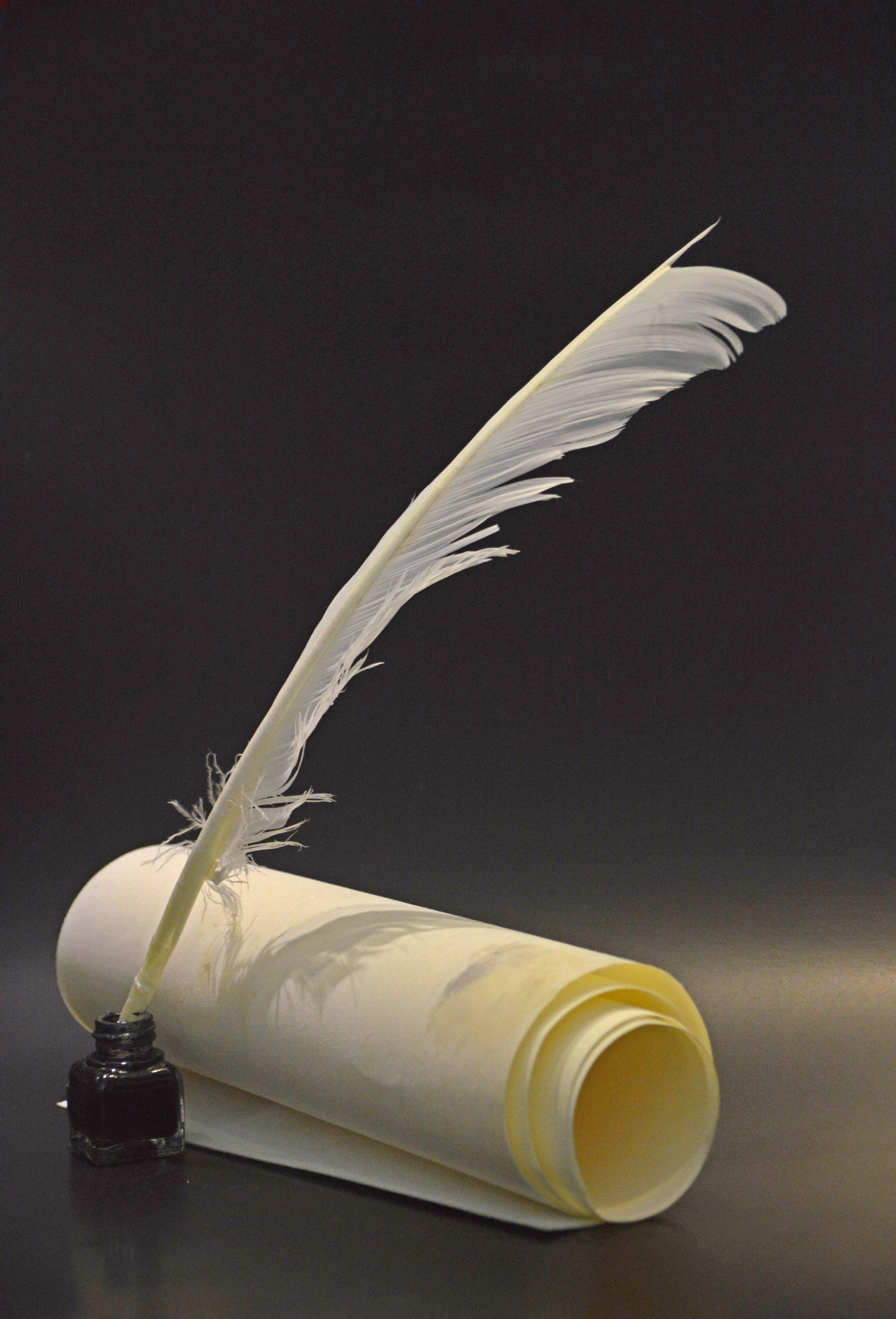
Writing ink and a quill

Ink is a gel, sol, or solution that contains at least one colorant, such as a dye or pigment, and is used to color a surface to produce an image, text, or design. Ink is used for drawing or writing with a pen, brush, reed pen, or quill. Thicker inks, in paste form, are used extensively in letterpress and lithographic printing.

Ink can be a complex medium, composed of solvents, pigments, dyes, resins, lubricants, solubilizers, surfactants, particulate matter, fluorescents, and other materials. The components of inks serve multiple purposes; the ink's carrier, colorants, and other additives affect the flow and thickness of the ink and its dry appearance.

== History ==
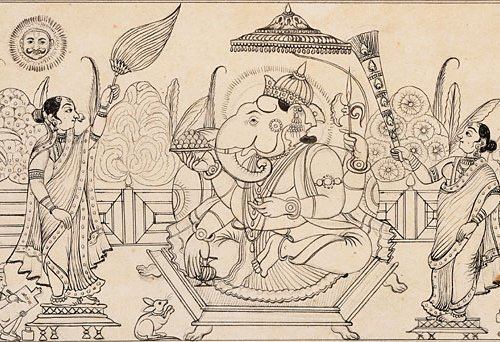
Ink drawing of Ganesha under an umbrella (early 19th century). Ink, called masi, an admixture of several chemical components, has been used in India since at least the 4th century BC. The practice of writing with ink and a sharp pointed needle was common in early South India. Several Jain sutras in India were compiled in ink.

Many ancient cultures around the world have independently discovered and formulated inks due to the need to write and draw. The recipes and techniques for the production of ink are derived from archaeological analyses or from written texts themselves. The earliest inks from all civilizations are believed to have been made with lampblack, a kind of soot, easily collected as a by-product of fire.

Ink was used in Ancient Egypt for writing and drawing on papyrus from at earliest the 26th century BC. Egyptian red and black inks included iron and ocher as pigments, in addition to phosphate, sulfate, chloride, and carboxylate ions, with lead also used as a drier.

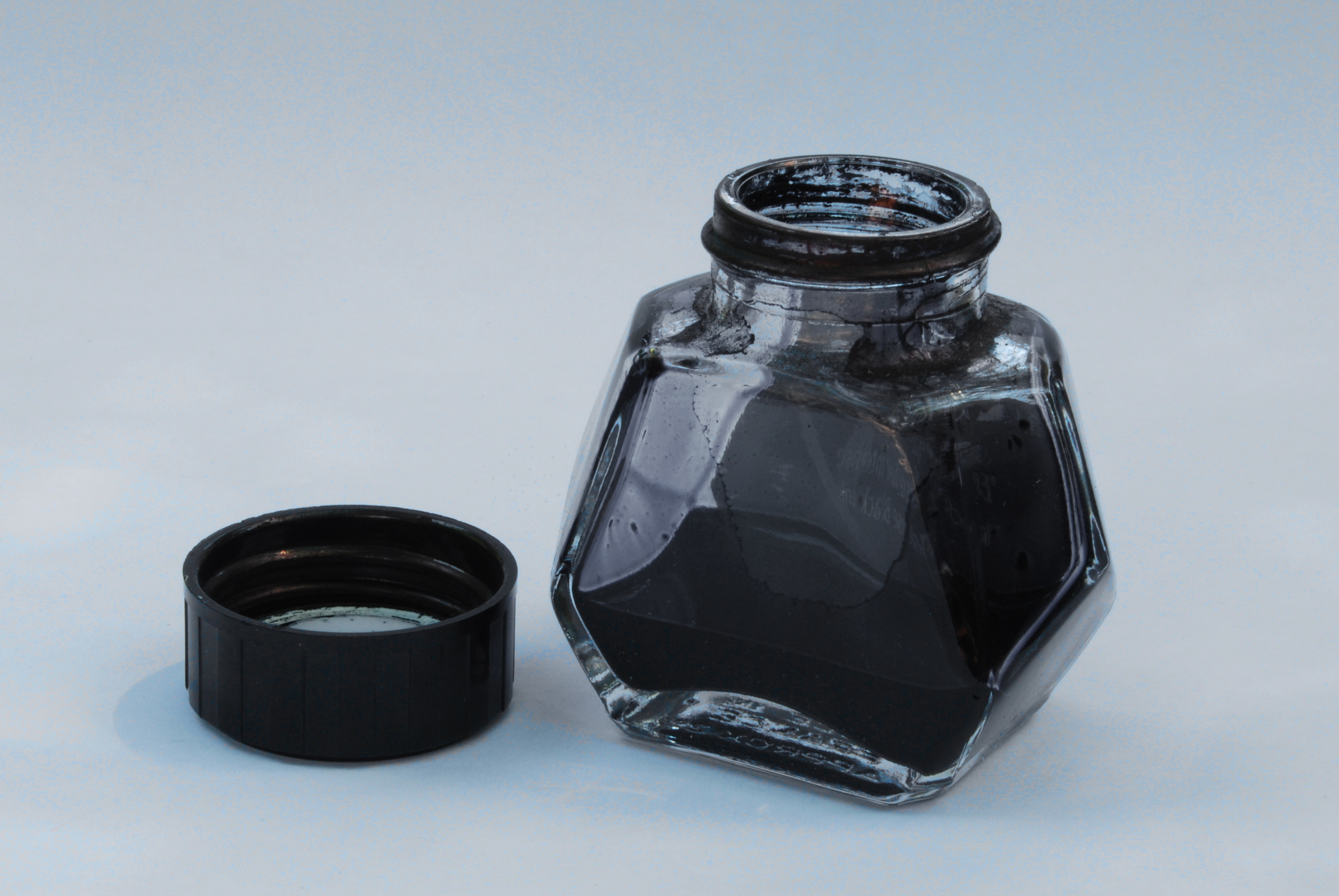
Black ink bottle

The earliest Chinese inks may date to four millennia ago, to the Chinese Neolithic Period. These included plant, animal, and mineral inks, based on such materials as graphite; these were ground with water and applied with ink brushes. Direct evidence for the earliest Chinese inks, similar to modern inksticks, is found around 256 BC, in the end of the Warring States period; being produced from soot and animal glue. The preferred inks for drawing or painting on paper or silk are produced from the resin of the pine trees between 50 and 100 years old. The Chinese inkstick is produced with a fish glue, whereas Japanese glue (膠 nikawa) is from cow or stag.

India ink was invented in China, though materials were often traded from India, hence the name. The traditional Chinese method of making the ink was to grind a mixture of hide glue, carbon black, lampblack, and bone black pigment with a pestle and mortar, then pour it into a ceramic dish to dry. To use the dry mixture, a wet brush would be applied until it reliquified. The manufacture of India ink was well-established by the Cao Wei dynasty (220–265 AD). Indian documents written in Kharosthi with ink have been unearthed in Xinjiang. The practice of writing with ink and a sharp pointed needle was common in early South India. Several Buddhist and Jain sutras in India were compiled in ink.

Cephalopod ink, known as sepia, turns from dark blue-black to brown on drying, and was used as an ink in the Graeco-Roman period and subsequently. Black atramentum was also used in ancient Rome; in an article for The Christian Science Monitor, Sharon J. Huntington describes these other historical inks:

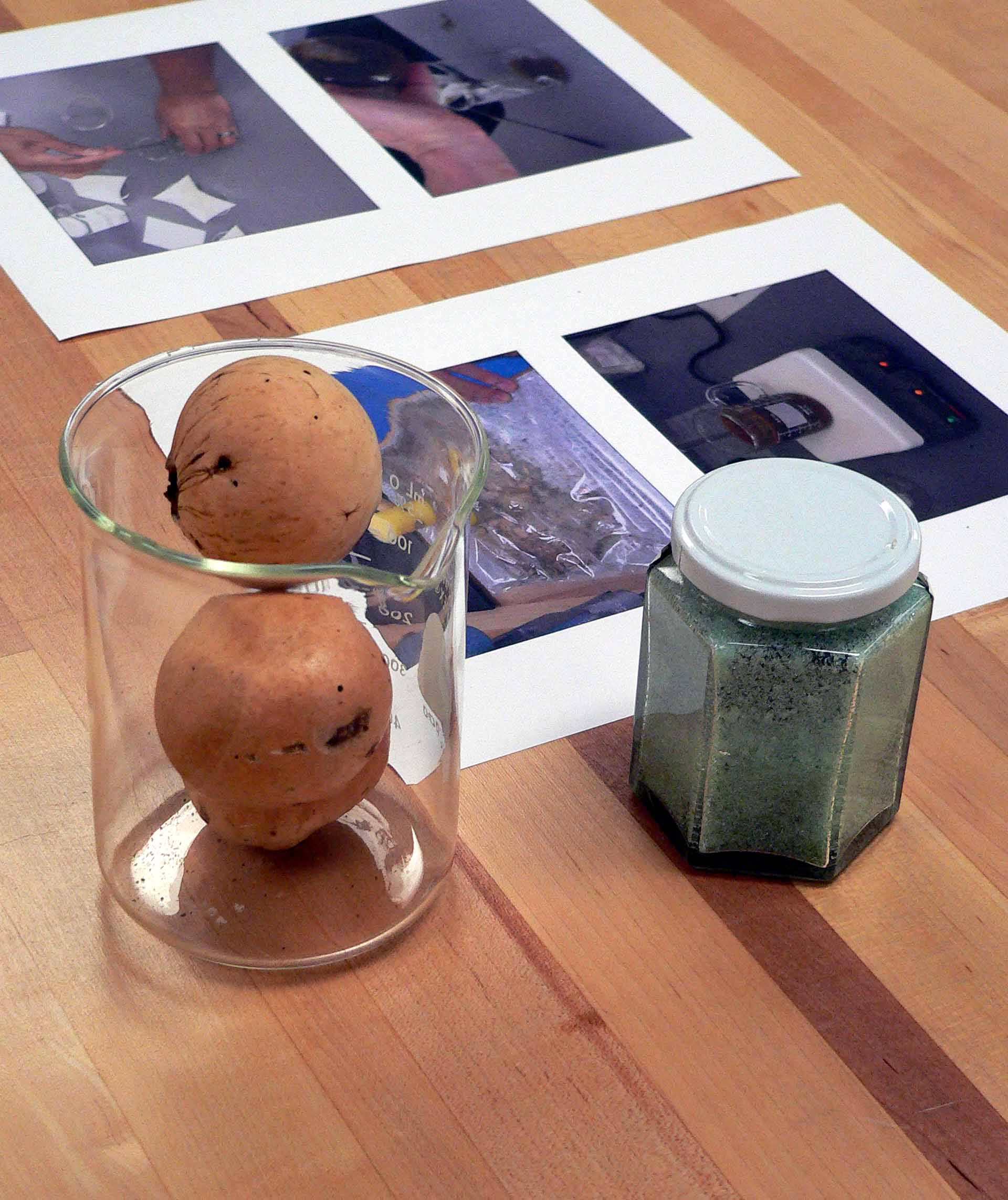
Oak galls and iron(II) sulfate

About 1,600 years ago, a popular ink recipe was created. The recipe was used for centuries. Iron salts, such as ferrous sulfate (made by treating iron with sulfuric acid), were mixed with tannin from gallnuts (they grow on trees) and a thickener. When first put to paper, this ink is bluish-black. Over time it fades to a dull brown.

Scribes in medieval Europe (about AD 800 to 1500) wrote principally on parchment or vellum. One 12th century ink recipe called for hawthorn branches to be cut in the spring and left to dry. Then the bark was pounded from the branches and soaked in water for eight days. The water was boiled until it thickened and turned black. Wine was added during boiling. The ink was poured into special bags and hung in the sun. Once dried, the mixture was mixed with wine and iron salt over a fire to make the final ink.

The reservoir pen, which may have been the first fountain pen, dates back to 953, when Ma'ād al-Mu'izz, the caliph of Egypt, demanded a pen that would not stain his hands or clothes, and was provided with a pen that held ink in a reservoir.

In the 15th century, a new type of ink had to be developed in Europe for the printing press by Johannes Gutenberg. According to Martyn Lyons in his book Books: A Living History, Gutenberg's dye was indelible, oil-based, and made from the soot of lamps (lamp-black) mixed with varnish and egg white. Two types of ink were prevalent at the time: the Greek and Roman writing ink (soot, glue, and water) and the 12th century variety composed of ferrous sulfate, gall, gum, and water. Neither of these handwriting inks could adhere to printing surfaces without creating blurs. Eventually an oily, varnish-like ink made of soot, turpentine, and walnut oil was created specifically for the printing press.

== Types ==
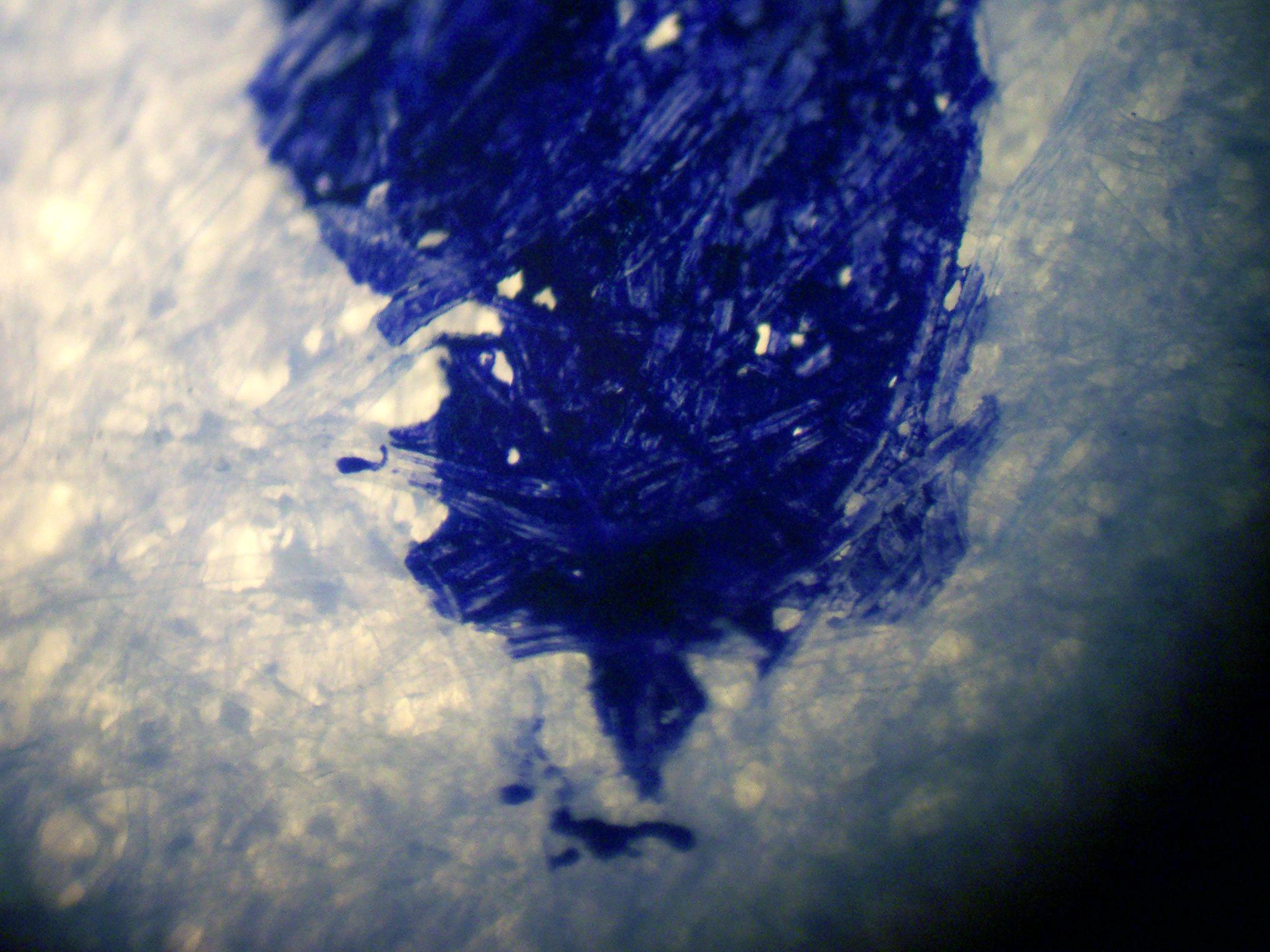
Magnified line drawn by a fountain pen

Ink formulas vary, but commonly involve two components:

- Colorants
- Vehicles (binders)

Inks generally fall into four classes:

- Aqueous
- Liquid
- Paste
- Powder

=== Colorants ===
==== Pigments ====
Pigment inks are used more frequently than dyes because they are more color-fast, but they are also more expensive, less consistent in color, and have less of a color range than dyes. Pigments are solid, opaque particles suspended in ink to provide color. Pigment molecules typically link together in crystalline structures that are 0.1–2 μm in size and comprise 5–30 percent of the ink volume. Qualities such as hue, saturation, and lightness vary depending on the source and type of pigment. Solvent-based inks are widely used for high-speed printing and applications that require quick drying times. And the inclusion of TiO_{2} powder provides superior coverage and vibrant colors.

==== Dyes ====
Dye-based inks are generally much stronger than pigment-based inks and can produce much more color of a given density per unit of mass. However, because dyes are dissolved in the liquid phase, they have a tendency to soak into paper, potentially allowing the ink to bleed at the edges of an image.

To circumvent this problem, dye-based inks are made with solvents that dry rapidly or are used with quick-drying methods of printing, such as blowing hot air on the fresh print. Other methods include harder paper sizing and more specialized paper coatings. The latter is particularly suited to inks used in non-industrial settings (which must conform to tighter toxicity and emission controls), such as inkjet printer inks. Another technique involves coating the paper with a charged coating. If the dye has the opposite charge, it is attracted to and retained by this coating, while the solvent soaks into the paper. Cellulose, the wood-derived material most paper is made of, is naturally charged, and so a compound that complexes with both the dye and the paper's surface aids retention at the surface. Such a compound is commonly used in ink-jet printing inks.

An additional advantage of dye-based ink systems is that the dye molecules can interact with other ink ingredients, potentially allowing greater benefit as compared to pigmented inks from optical brighteners and color-enhancing agents designed to increase the intensity and appearance of dyes.

Dye-based inks can be used for anti-counterfeit purposes and can be found in some gel inks, fountain pen inks, and inks used for paper currency. These inks react with cellulose to bring about a permanent color change. Dye based inks are used to color hair.

==== Functional colorants ====
Functional colorants represent a distinct class of color-producing materials used in inks that provide effects beyond simple absorption, including fluorescence, phosphorescence, thermochromism, and photochromism. These colorants are commonly used in security printing, smart packaging, and specialty applications, where their ability to change appearance in response to light, temperature, or other stimuli is advantageous. Modern formulations employ microencapsulated dyes, rare-earth phosphors, or polymer-based nanoparticles that allow these materials to be incorporated into liquid and inkjet-compatible systems.

== Health and environmental aspects ==
There is a misconception that ink is non-toxic even if swallowed. Once ingested, ink can be hazardous to one's health. Certain inks, such as those used in digital printers, and even those found in a common pen, can be harmful. Though ink does not easily cause death, repeated skin contact or ingestion can cause effects such as severe headaches, skin irritation, or nervous system damage. These effects can be caused by solvents, or by pigment ingredients such as p-Anisidine, which helps create some inks' color and shine.

Three main environmental issues with ink are:

- Heavy metals
- Non-renewable oils
- Volatile organic compounds

Some regulatory bodies have set standards for the amount of heavy metals in ink. There is a trend toward vegetable oils rather than petroleum oils in recent years in response to a demand for better environmental sustainability performance.

Ink uses up non-renewable oils and metals, which has a negative impact on the environment.

=== Carbon ===
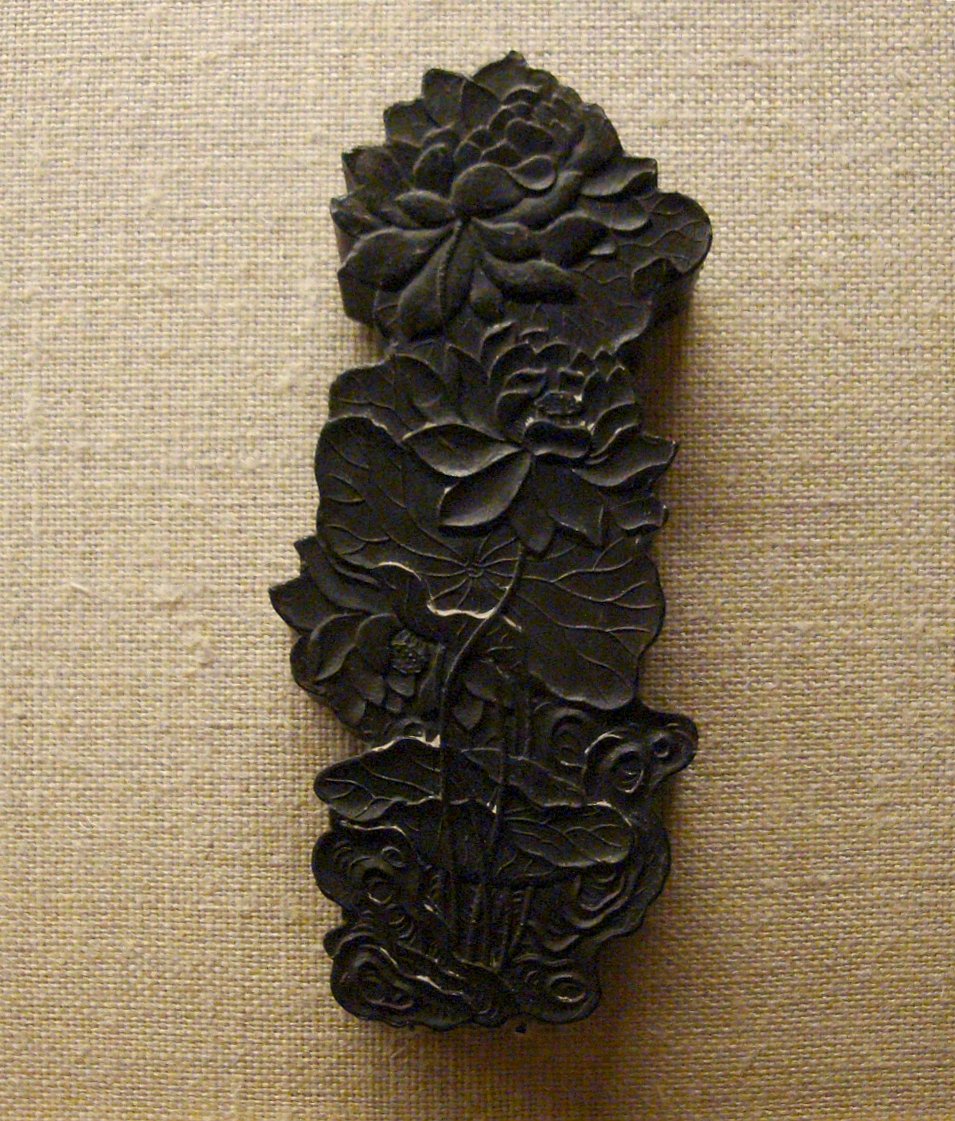
Chinese inkstick; carbon-based and made from soot and animal glue

Carbon inks were commonly made from lampblack or soot and a binding agent such as gum arabic or animal glue. The binding agent keeps carbon particles in suspension and adhered to paper. Carbon particles do not fade over time even when bleached or when in sunlight. One benefit is that carbon ink does not harm paper. Over time, the ink is chemically stable and therefore does not threaten the paper's strength. Despite these benefits, carbon ink is not ideal for permanence and ease of preservation. Carbon ink tends to smudge in humid environments and can be washed off surfaces. The best method of preserving a document written in carbon ink is to store it in a dry environment (Barrow 1972).

Recently, carbon inks made from carbon nanotubes have been successfully created. They are similar in composition to traditional inks in that they use a polymer to suspend the carbon nanotubes. These inks can be used in inkjet printers and produce electrically conductive patterns.

=== Iron gall (common ink) ===
Iron gall inks became prominent in the early 12th century; they were used for centuries and were widely thought to be the best type of ink. However, iron gall ink is corrosive and damages paper over time (Waters 1940). Items containing this ink can become brittle and the writing fades to brown. The original scores of Johann Sebastian Bach are threatened by the destructive properties of iron gall ink. The majority of his works are held by the German State Library, and about 25% of those are in advanced stages of decay (American Libraries 2000). The rate at which the writing fades is based on several factors, such as proportions of ink ingredients, amount deposited on the paper, and paper composition (Barrow 1972:16). Corrosion is caused by acid catalyzed hydrolysis and iron(II)-catalysed oxidation of cellulose (Rouchon-Quillet 2004:389).

Treatment for preservation is a controversial subject. No treatment undoes damage already caused by acidic ink. Deterioration can only be stopped or slowed. Some think it best not to treat the item at all for fear of the consequences. Others believe that non-aqueous procedures are the best solution. Yet others think an aqueous procedure may preserve items written with iron gall ink. Aqueous treatments include distilled water at different temperatures, calcium hydroxide, calcium bicarbonate, magnesium carbonate, magnesium bicarbonate, and calcium hyphenate. There are a number of possible side effects from these treatments. There can be mechanical damage, which further weakens the paper. Paper color or ink color may change, and ink may bleed. Other consequences of aqueous treatment are a change of ink texture or formation of plaque on the surface of the ink (Reibland & de Groot 1999).

Iron gall inks require storage in a stable environment, because fluctuating relative humidity increases the rate that formic acid, acetic acid, and furan derivatives form in the material the ink was used on. Sulfuric acid acts as a catalyst to cellulose hydrolysis, and iron (II) sulfate acts as a catalyst to cellulose oxidation. These chemical reactions physically weaken the paper, causing brittleness.

== Indelible ink ==
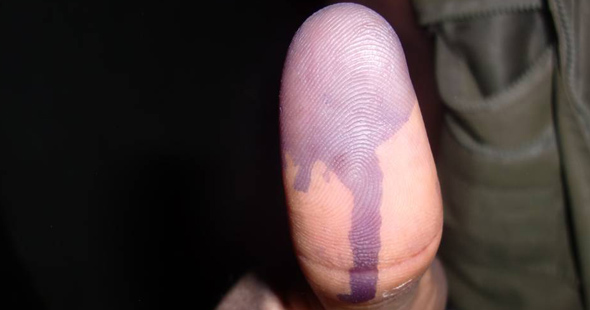
A voter's thumb stained with indelible ink

Indelible means "un-removable". Some types of indelible ink have a very short shelf life because of the quickly evaporating solvents used. India, Mexico, Indonesia, Malaysia and other developing countries have used indelible ink in the form of electoral stain to prevent electoral fraud. Election ink based on silver nitrate was first applied in the 1962 Indian general election, after being developed at the National Physical Laboratory of India.

The election commission in India has used indelible ink for a number of elections. Indonesia used it in its election in 2014. In Mali, the ink is applied to the fingernail. The technique is not infallible and can itself be used in other types of fraud, as rather than bolstering one's own votes it can be used to eliminate opponent voters by marking them before they have chances to cast their votes. There are also reports of "indelible" ink washing off voters' fingers in Afghanistan.

== Inkblots ==
In 19th century German poet Justinus Kerner invented the art of klecksography, making images from inkblots (German Tinten-Klecks) and in 1857 he published a book of klecksographs and poetry titled Klecksographien. In 1896, a similar book titled Gobolinks, or Shadow-Pictures for Young and Old was published in the United States.

In his childhood, Hermann Rorschach had a klecksography hobby, and this eventually led to the development of his Rorschach test.

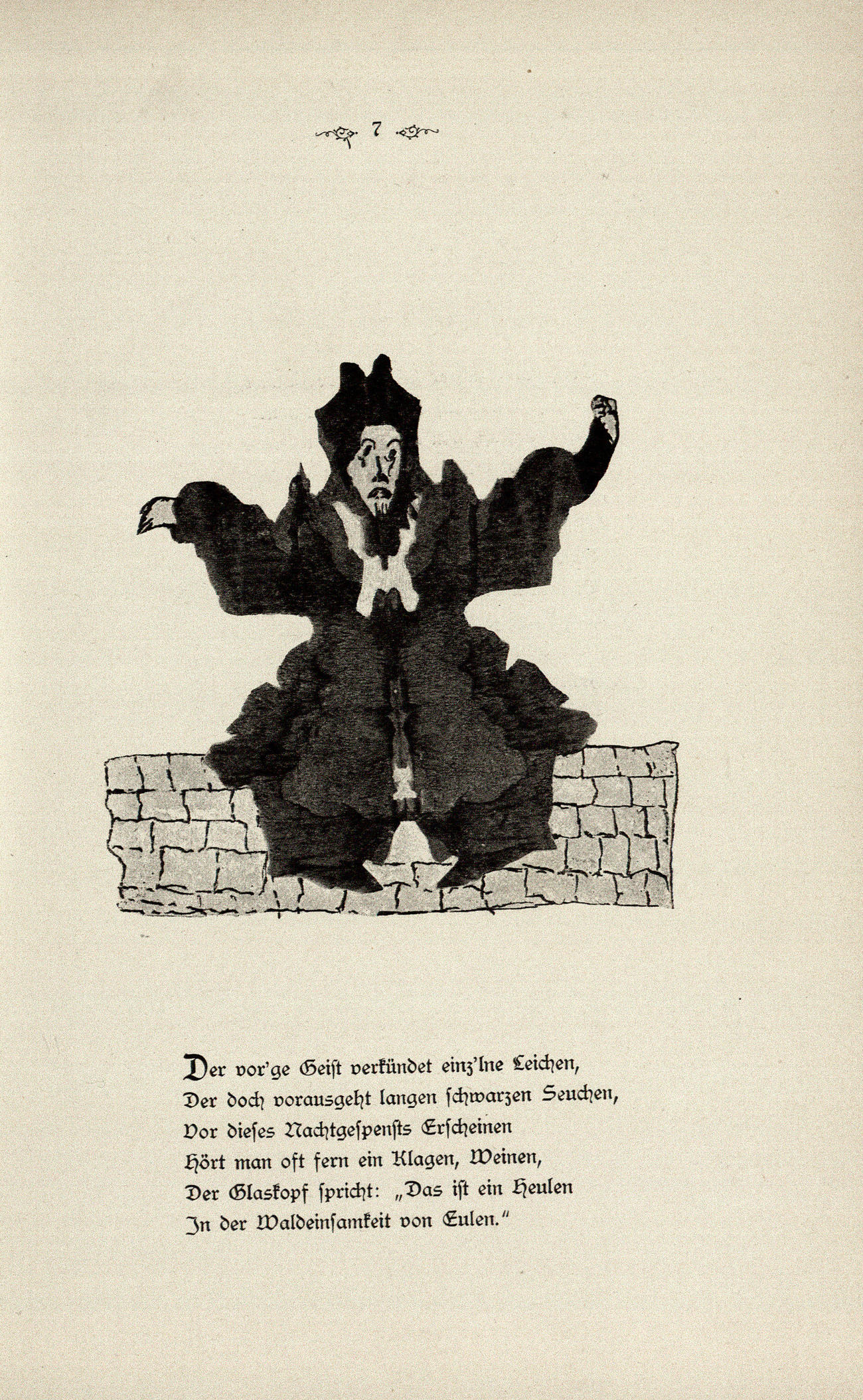
From Justinus Kerner's Klecksographien (1890)
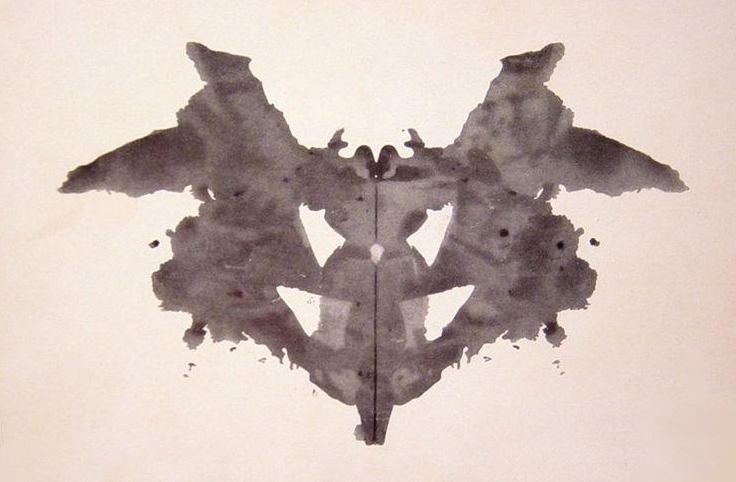
A Rorschach's blot

== See also ==
- De-inked pulp
- Ecofont, an inksaving typeface
- Gel pen
- Ink eraser
- Inkjet printing
- Preservation of manuscripts
- Squid ink
- Toner (printing)

== Sources ==
- Ainsworth, Mitchell, C., "Inks and Their Composition and Manufacture", Charles Griffin and Company Ltd, 1904.
- N.a. (March 2000), "Bach Scores Turning to Dust in German Library", American Libraries: 24–25
- Banerji, Sures Chandra (1989). A Companion to Sanskrit Literature. Motilal Banarsidass. ISBN 81-208-0063-X.
- Barrow, W.J. (1972), Manuscripts and Documents: Their Deterioration and Restoration, Charlottesville: University of Virginia Press, ISBN 978-0813904085
- Martín-Gil J., Ramos-Sánchez MC, Martín-Gil FJ and José-Yacamán M. "Chemical composition of a fountain pen ink". Journal of Chemical Education, 2006, 83, 1476–78.
- Reißland, Birgit; de Groot, Suzan (August 15–21, 1999), "Ink Corrosion: Comparison of the Currently Used Aqueous Treatments for Paper Objects", Preprint from the 9th International Congress of IADA, pp. 121–129
- Rouchon-Quillet, V.; Remazeilles, C.; Bernard, J.; Wattiaux, A.; Fournes, L.; et al. (2004), "The Impact of Gallic Acid on Iron Gall Ink Corrosion", Applied Physics A, 79 (2): 389–392, Bibcode:2004ApPhA..79..389R, doi:10.1007/s00339-004-2541-1, S2CID 95990608
- Sircar, D. C. (1996).Indian epigraphy. Motilal Banarsidass. ISBN 81-208-1166-6.
- Waters, C.E. (1940), Inks, U.S. Department of Commerce, National Bureau of Standards, United States Government Printing Office
