= Rorschach Performance Assessment System =

The Rorschach Performance Assessment System (R-PAS) is a scoring and interpretive method to be used with the Rorschach inkblot test. This system is being developed by several members of the Rorschach Research Council, a group established by John Exner to advance the research on the Comprehensive System, the most widely used scoring system for the Rorschach. Following Exner's death, the council admitted that the current Comprehensive System scoring was in need of revision. R-PAS was developed as an empirically based revision of the Exner Comprehensive System.

The R-PAS is an empirically based, and internationally normed scoring system that is easier to use than Exner's Comprehensive System. The R-PAS manual is intended to be a comprehensive tool for administering, scoring, and interpreting the Rorschach. The manual consists of two chapters that are basics of scoring and interpretation, aimed for use for novice Rorschach users, followed by numerous chapters containing more detailed and technical information. The manual is supplemented by a website in which additional information and resources are available to aid administration of the Rorschach.

== Administration ==
R-optimized procedures of administration instruct examiners to ask the respondents to provide two or three responses for each of the 10 Rorschach cards. Examiners may use “prompts” to encourage examinees to give more responses or “pulls” to ask examinees to give the card back to the examiner. This procedure is meant to increase the stability of the administration and attempt to eliminate the extremes of responding; too few responses or too many responses.

== Scoring ==
The authors did not create new variables or indices to be coded, but systematically reviewed variables that had been used in past systems. While all of these codes have been used in the past, many have been renamed to be more face valid and readily understood. Scoring of the indices has been updated (e.g. utilizing percentiles and Standard Scores) to make the Rorschach more in line with other popular personality measures.

In addition to providing coding guidelines to score examinee responses, the R-PAS provides a system to code an examinee's behavior during Rorschach administration. These behavioral codes are included as it is believed that the behaviors exhibited during testing are a reflection of someone's task performance and supplements the actual responses given. This allows generalizations to be made between someone's responses to the cards and their actual behavior.

== Normative data ==
The R-PAS also recognized that scoring on many of the Rorschach variables differed across countries. Therefore, starting in 1997, Rorschach protocols from researchers around the world were compiled. After compiling protocols for over a decade, a total of 15 adult samples were used to provide a normative basis for the R-PAS. The protocols represent data gathered in the United States, Europe, Israel, Argentina and Brazil.

== New variables ==
The R-PAS includes new variables not from the Comprehensive System including Complexity, Space Integration, Space Reversal, Oral Dependency Language, the Mutuality of Autonomy scale, the Ego Impairment Index, and Aggressive Content. All of the variables selected for the R-PAS have been used by others in the past, either as part of previous systems for using the Rorschach, or as stand-alone independently coded variables. Prior research on these variables have shown correlation coefficients around approximately 0.9.

== Inter-rater reliability ==
Preliminary data used to evaluate the reliability of the R-PAS scoring system shows that two different raters scored the same responses similarly. In the study, 50 records of responses to Rorschach cards were randomly selected and given to two different raters to be coded. The coded responses were compared and the results indicate an average intraclass correlation of 0.88 and median of 0.92 across all of the variables. The findings indicate good to excellent inter-rater reliability which is consistent with previous findings for the variables used in the scoring.

== Forensic application ==
There are advantages to using the R-PAS in forensic evaluations, and authors have described appropriated and inappropriate use of it in court. Some advantages to its use include incremental validity over self-report measures, protection against inaccurate symptom presentation, information regarding states and traits, adjustments for abnormal response records, accurate pathology interpretations, organization of results, and easily understood interpretations.

However, some present the argument the R-PAS fails to meet the necessary criteria for admissibility according to the Frye and Daubert guidelines. Some of the major concerns regarding the R-PAS include its psychometric properties, lack of current normative data, and the absence of independent groups completing research in the area. There is not consensus regarding the admissibility of the R-PAS in court, however, as others would argue the criteria are met.
