= Are You Smart Enough to Work at Google? =

- Author: William Poundstone
- Language: English
- Genre: Business
- Publisher: Little Brown
- Publication date: 2012
- Publication place: United States
- Media type: Print
- Pages: 304 pp
- ISBN: 978-0-316-09997-4
- OCLC: 688643445

Are You Smart Enough to Work at Google? (subtitled Trick Questions, Zen-Like Riddles, Insanely Difficult Puzzles, and Other Devious Interviewing Techniques) is a 2012 business book by Pulitzer Prize-nominated science writer, William Poundstone, describing details of the methods used and questions asked of job applicants to Google.

== See also ==
- Microsoft interview
