= Klecksography =

Inkblot art

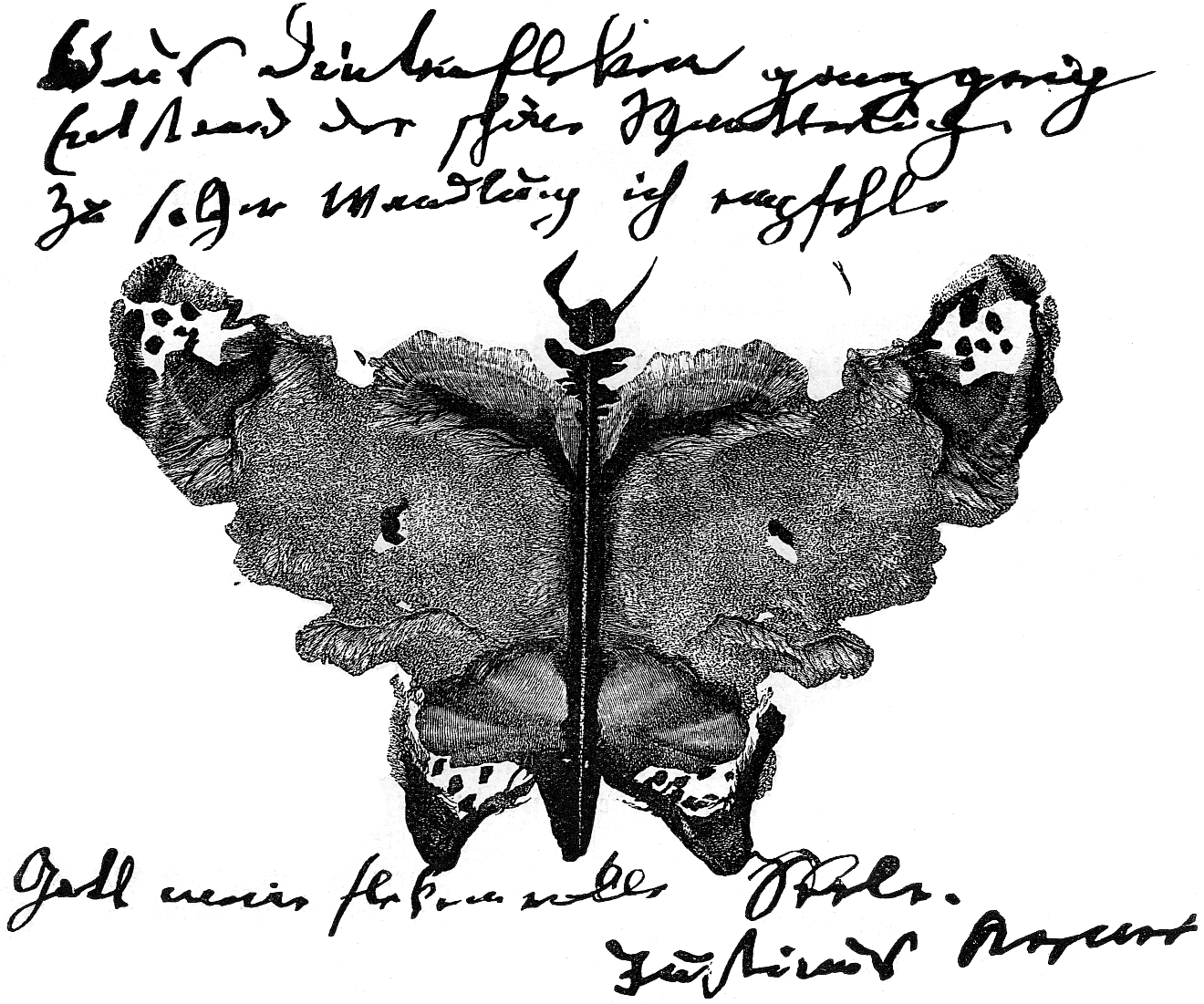
A klecksograph by Justinus Kerner, published 1879

Klecksography is the art of making images from inkblots (German Tinten-Klecks). The work was pioneered by Justinus Kerner, who included klecksographs in his books of poetry. Since the 1890s, psychologists have used it as a tool for studying the subconscious, most famously Hermann Rorschach in his Rorschach inkblot test.

== Method ==
Spots of ink are dropped onto a piece of paper and the paper is folded in half, so that the ink will smudge and form a mirror reflection in the two halves. The piece of paper is then unfolded so that the ink can dry, after which someone can guess the resemblance of the print to other objects. The inkblots tend to resemble images because of apophenia, the human tendency to see patterns in nature.

== History ==
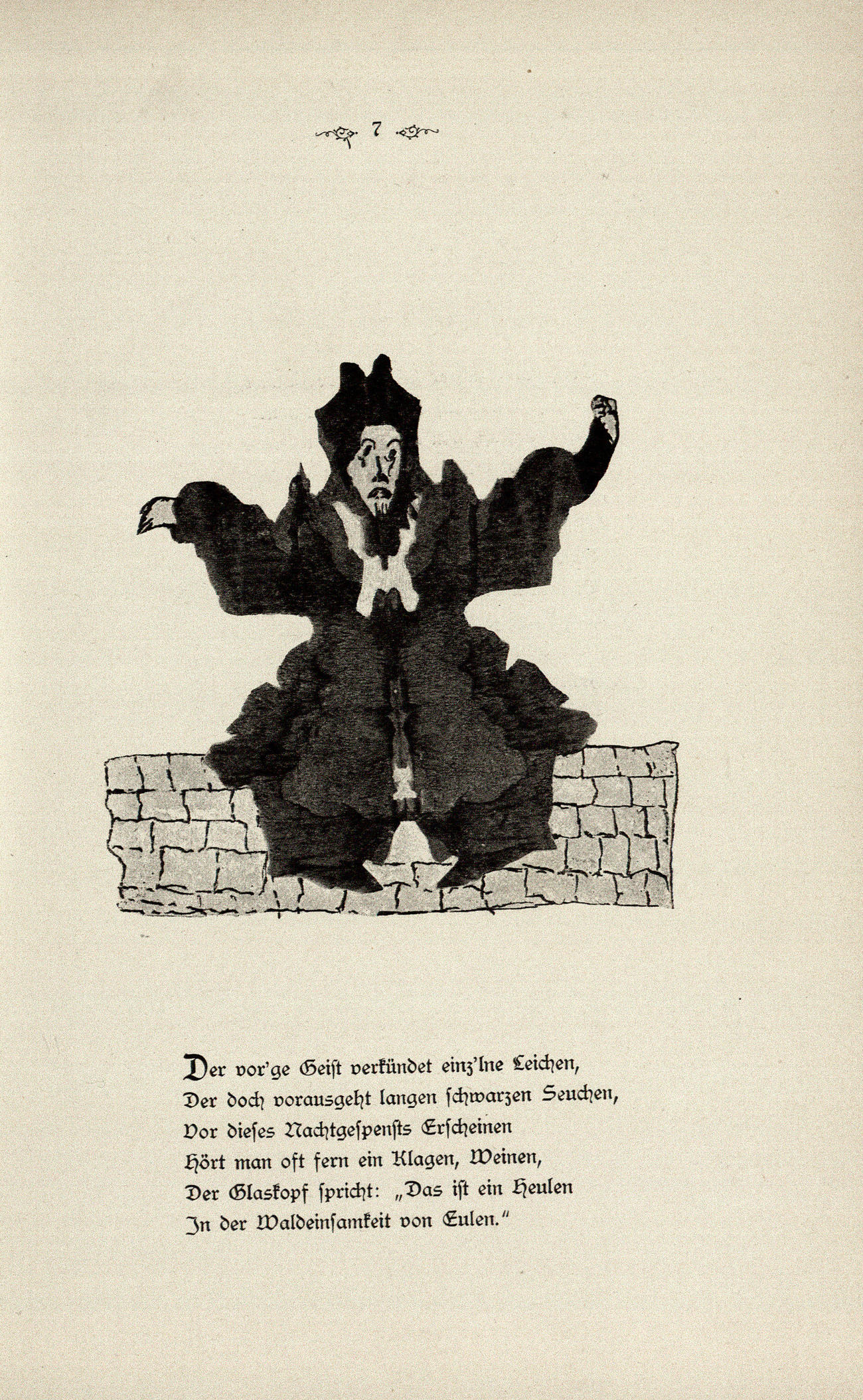
A page of poetry and art from Justinus Kerner's Klecksographien (1890)

Justinus Kerner invented this technique when he started accidentally dropping blots of ink onto paper due to failing eyesight. Instead of throwing them away, he found that intriguing shapes appeared if he unfolded the papers. He elaborated these shapes into intricate cartoons and used them to illustrate his poems. Kerner began a collection of klecksographs and poetry in 1857 titled Klecksographien (and reproduced in several later editions).

In 1896, a similar game was described in the United States by Ruth McEnery Stuart and Albert Bigelow Paine in a book titled Gobolinks, or Shadow-Pictures for Young and Old. The book explained how to make inkblot monsters ("gobolinks") and use them as prompts for writing imaginative verse.

== Use in psychology ==
=== Binet and Henri ===
As early as 1895, Alfred Binet and his associate Victor Henri first suggested that inkblots might be used in psychological research, arguing that the interpretation of inkblots could be used to study variations in ‘involuntary imagination’.

=== Rorschach ===
As a child in Switzerland, Hermann Rorschach enjoyed klecksography so much that his friends nicknamed him "Klecks", meaning "inkblot". As a medical student, Rorschach studied under psychiatrist Eugen Bleuler, who had taught Carl Jung. In studying Freud's work on dream symbolism, Rorschach was reminded of his youthful inkblot hobby. He then created his Rorschach test to see if people's reactions to inkblots could be used as a tool to uncover unconscious desires. The test is essentially a visual variation on Freud's verbal technique.

== See also ==
- Holtzman Inkblot Test
- Active imagination
- Pareidolia
- Talking cure
