= Rorschach test =

Projective psychological test created in 1921

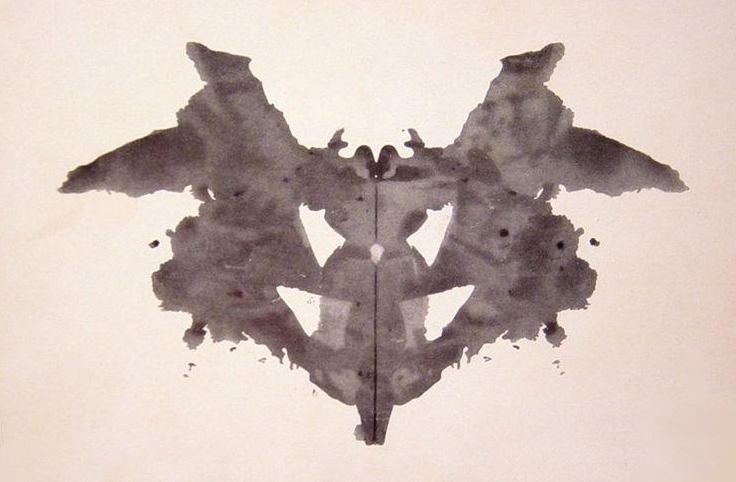
The first of the ten cards in the Rorschach test
- Pronunciation: /ˈrɔːrʃɑːk/, UK also /-ʃæk/ German: [ˈʁoːɐ̯ʃax]
- Synonyms: Rorschach inkblot test, the Rorschach technique, inkblot test
- MeSH: D012392

The Rorschach test is a projective psychological test in which subjects' perceptions of inkblots are recorded and then analyzed using psychological interpretation, complex algorithms, or both. Some psychologists use this test to examine a person's personality characteristics and emotional functioning. It has been employed to detect underlying thought disorder, especially in cases where patients are reluctant to describe their thinking processes openly. The test is named after its creator, Swiss psychologist Hermann Rorschach. The Rorschach can be thought of as a psychometric examination of pareidolia, the active pattern of perceiving objects, shapes, or scenery as meaningful things to the observer's experience, the most common being faces or other patterns of forms that are not present at the time of the observation. In the 1960s, the Rorschach was the most widely used projective test.

The original Rorschach testing system faced numerous criticisms, which the Exner Scoring System—developed after extensive research in the 1960s and 1970s—aimed to address, particularly to improve consistency and reduce subjectivity. Despite these efforts, researchers continue to raise concerns about aspects of the test, including the objectivity of testers and inter-rater reliability, the verifiability and general validity of the test, bias in the test's pathology scales toward higher numbers of responses, its limited diagnostic utility and lack of replicability, its use in court-ordered evaluations and the value of projected images in general.

== History ==
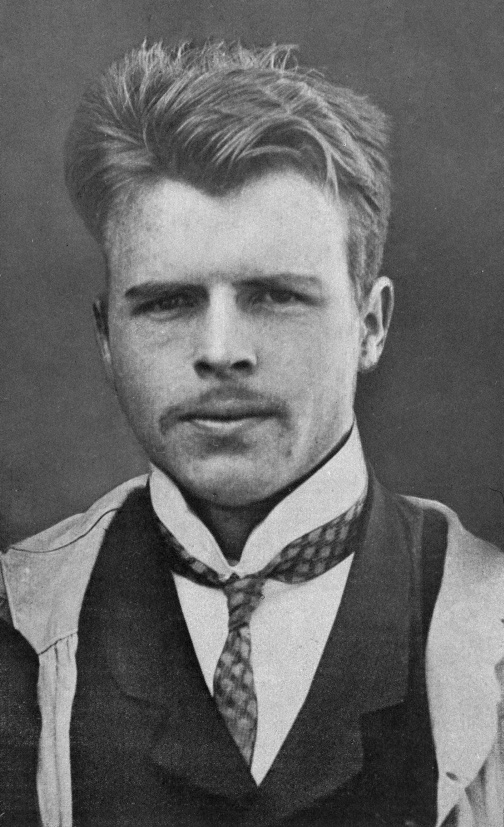
Hermann Rorschach created the inkblot test in 1921. (Photo from c. 1910)

The use of interpreting "ambiguous designs" to assess an individual's personality is an idea that goes back to Leonardo da Vinci and Botticelli. Interpretation of inkblots was central to a game, Gobolinks, from the late 19th century. The Rorschach test, however, was the first systematic approach of this kind.

After studying 300 mental patients and 100 control subjects, in 1921 Hermann Rorschach wrote his book Psychodiagnostik, which was to form the basis of the inkblot test. After experimenting with several hundred inkblots which he drew himself, he selected a set of ten for their diagnostic value. Although he had served as Vice President of the Swiss Psychoanalytic Society, Rorschach had difficulty in publishing the book and it attracted little attention when it first appeared. Rorschach died the following year.

It has been suggested that Rorschach's use of inkblots may have been influenced by German doctor Justinus Kerner who, in 1857, had published a popular book of poems, each of which was inspired by an accidental inkblot. French psychologist Alfred Binet had also experimented with inkblots as a creativity test, and, after the turn of the century, psychological experiments where inkblots were utilized multiplied, with aims such as studying imagination and consciousness.

In 1927, the newly founded Hans Huber publishing house purchased Rorschach's book Psychodiagnostik from the inventory of Ernst Bircher. Huber remains the publisher of the test and related book, with Rorschach a registered trademark of Swiss publisher Verlag Hans Huber, Hogrefe AG. The work has been described as "a densely written piece couched in dry, scientific terminology".

After Rorschach's death, the original test scoring system was improved by Samuel Beck, Bruno Klopfer and others. John E. Exner summarized some of these later developments in the comprehensive system, at the same time trying to make the scoring more statistically rigorous. Some systems are based on the psychoanalytic concept of object relations. The Exner system remains very popular in the United States, while in Europe other methods sometimes dominate, such as that described in the textbook by Ewald Bohm, which is closer to the original Rorschach system and rooted more deeply in the original psychoanalysis principles.

Rorschach never intended the inkblots to be used as a general personality test, but developed them as a tool for the diagnosis of schizophrenia. It was not until 1939 that the test was used as a projective test of personality, a use of which Rorschach had always been skeptical. Interviewed in 2012 for a BBC Radio 4 documentary, Rita Signer, curator of the Rorschach Archives in Bern, Switzerland, suggested that the blots selected by Rorschach were not random, but rather were carefully chosen to be as ambiguous and "conflicted" as possible.

== Method ==
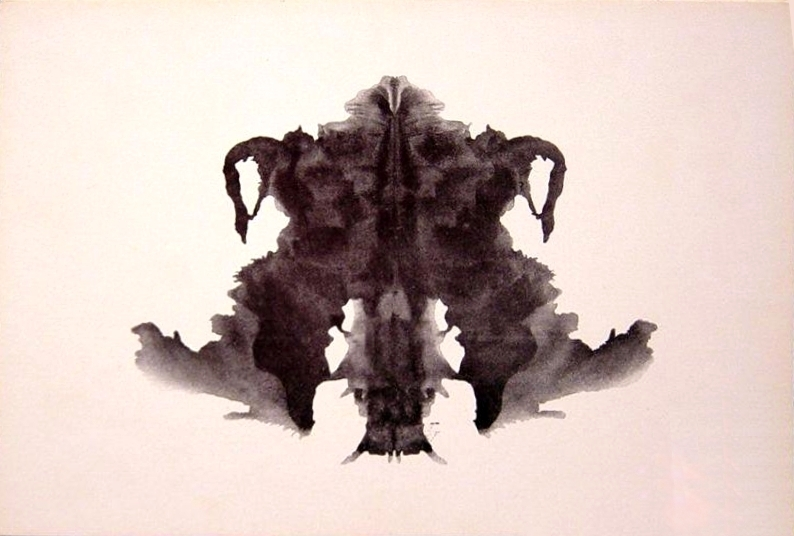
Card IV of the test, sometimes subjectively called the “Father Card” (without empirical verification), is noted for its imposing image and thematic emphasis on authority, strength, and male figures.

The Rorschach test is appropriate for subjects from the age of five to adulthood. The administrator and subject typically sit next to each other at a table, with the administrator slightly behind the subject. Side-by-side seating of the examiner and the subject is used to reduce any effects of inadvertent cues from the examiner to the subject. In other words, side-by-side seating mitigates the possibility that the examiner will accidentally influence the subject's responses. This is to facilitate a "relaxed but controlled atmosphere".

There are ten official inkblots, each printed on a separate white card, approximately 18 by 24 centimetres (7.1 by 9.4 in) in size. Each of the blots has near perfect bilateral symmetry. The inkblots include variations in color (some monochromatic, some multicolored) and shading, each potentially eliciting different types of responses. According to various authors, they commonly evoke perceptions of animals, human figures, or abstract shapes, and may provoke associations related to authority, interpersonal dynamics, or sexuality. Certain inkblots are also noted for thematic emphasis. The test introduces increasing visual complexity and color, which can assess the subject's emotional and cognitive responses to less structured stimuli. Together, the images are designed to reveal patterns in personality, thought processes, and affective functioning as the subject progresses through the test.

After the test subject has seen and responded to all of the inkblots (free association phase), the tester then presents them again one at a time in a set sequence for the subject to study: the subject is asked to note where they see what they originally saw and what makes it look like that (inquiry phase). The subject is usually asked to hold the cards and may rotate them. Whether the cards are rotated, and other related factors such as whether permission to rotate them is asked, may expose personality traits and normally contribute to the assessment.

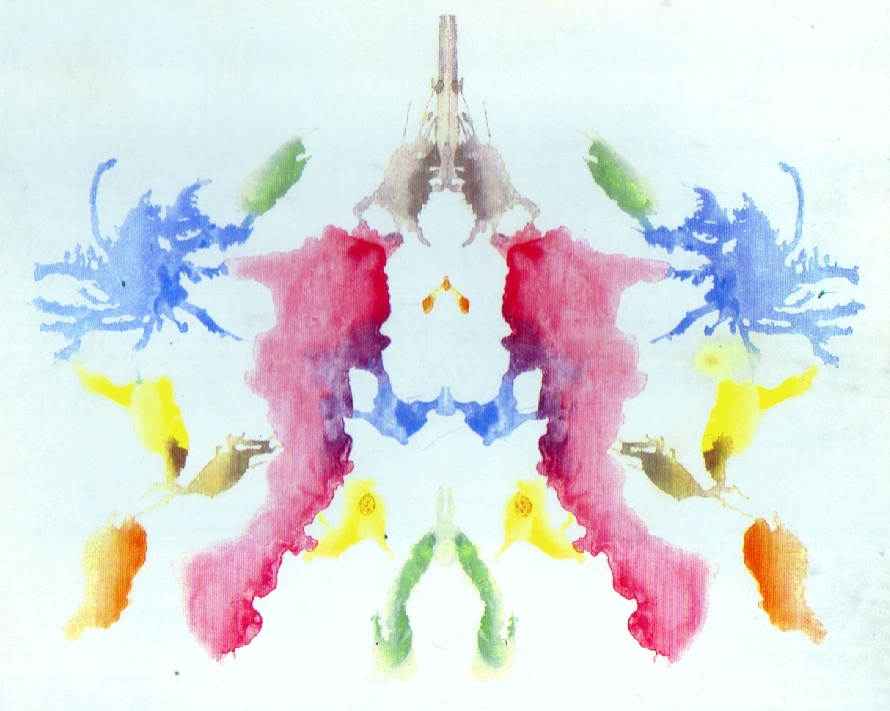
Card X is one of the cards to feature color, often evoking more complex associations than the monochrome plates.

As the subject examines the inkblots, the psychologist writes down everything the subject says or does, no matter how trivial. Analysis of responses is recorded by the test administrator using a tabulation and scoring sheet and, if required, a separate location chart.

The general goal of the test is to provide data about cognition and personality variables such as motivations, response tendencies, cognitive operations, affectivity, and personal/interpersonal perceptions. The underlying assumption is that an individual will class external stimuli based on person-specific perceptual sets, and including needs, base motives, conflicts, and that this clustering process is representative of the process used in real-life situations.

Methods of interpretation differ. Rorschach scoring systems have been described as a system of pegs on which to hang one's knowledge of personality. The most widely used method in the United States is based on the work of Exner. Administration of the test to a group of subjects, by means of projected images, has also occasionally been performed, but mainly for research rather than diagnostic purposes.

Test administration is not to be confused with test interpretation:

The interpretation of a Rorschach record is a complex process. It requires a wealth of knowledge concerning personality dynamics generally as well as considerable experience with the Rorschach method specifically. Proficiency as a Rorschach administrator can be gained within a few months. However, even those who are able and qualified to become Rorschach interpreters usually remain in a "learning stage" for a number of years.

=== Features or categories ===
The interpretation of the Rorschach test is not based primarily on the contents of the response, i.e., what the individual sees in the inkblot (the content). The contents of the response are only a comparatively small portion of a broader cluster of variables that are used to interpret the Rorschach data: for instance, information is provided by the time taken before providing a response for a card can be significant (taking a long time can indicate "shock" on the card). As well as by any comments the subject may make in addition to providing a direct response.

In particular, information about determinants (the aspects of the inkblots that triggered the response, such as form and color) and location (which details of the inkblots triggered the response) is often considered more important than content, although there is contrasting evidence. "Popularity" and "originality" of responses can also be considered as basic dimensions in the analysis.

==== Content ====
The goal in coding content of the Rorschach is to categorize the objects that the subject describes in response to the inkblot. There are 27 established codes for identifying the name of the descriptive object. The codes are classified and include terms such as "human", "nature", "animal", "abstract", "clothing", "fire", and "x-ray", to name a few. Content described that does not have a code already established should be coded using the code "idiographic contents" with the shorthand code being "Idio." Items are also coded for statistical popularity (or, conversely, originality).

More than any other feature in the test, content response can be controlled consciously by the subject, and may be elicited by very disparate factors, which makes it difficult to use content alone to draw any conclusions about the subject's personality; with certain individuals, content responses may potentially be interpreted directly, and some information can at times be obtained by analyzing thematic trends in the whole set of content responses (which is only feasible when several responses are available), but in general content cannot be analyzed outside of the context of the entire test record.

==== Location ====
Identifying the location of the subject's response is another element scored in the Rorschach system. Location refers to how much of the inkblot was used to answer the question. Administrators score the response "W" if the whole inkblot was used to answer the question, "D" if a commonly described part of the blot was used, "Dd" if an uncommonly described or unusual detail was used, or "S" if the white space in the background was used. A score of W is typically associated with the subject's motivation to interact with his or her surrounding environment. D is interpreted as one having efficient or adequate functioning. A high frequency of responses coded Dd indicate some maladjustment within the individual. Responses coded S indicate an oppositional or uncooperative test subject.

==== Determinants ====
Systems for Rorschach scoring generally include a concept of "determinants": These are the factors that contribute to establishing the similarity between the inkblot and the subject's content response about it. They can also represent certain basic experiential-perceptual attitudes, showing aspects of the way a subject perceives the world. Rorschach's original work used only form, color and movement as determinants. However currently, another major determinant considered is shading, which was inadvertently introduced by poor printing quality of the inkblots. Rorschach initially disregarded shading, since the inkblots originally featured uniform saturation, but later recognized it as a significant factor.

Form is the most common determinant, and is related to intellectual processes. Color responses often provide direct insight into one's emotional life. Movement and shading have been considered more ambiguously, both in definition and interpretation. Rorschach considered movement only as the experiencing of actual motion, while others have widened the scope of this determinant, taking it to mean that the subject sees something "going on".

More than one determinant can contribute to the formation of the subject's perception. Fusion of two determinants is taken into account, while also assessing which of the two constituted the primary contributor. For example, "form-color" implies a more refined control of impulse than "color-form". It is, indeed, from the relation and balance among determinants that personality can be most readily inferred.

=== Symmetry of the test items ===
A characteristic of the Rorschach inkblots is their symmetry. For many, this is unexceptional, but Rorschach, and subsequent researchers, considered the issue. Rorschach experimented with both asymmetric and symmetric images before choosing the latter, giving the explanation:

Asymmetric figures are rejected by many subjects; symmetry supplied part of the necessary artistic composition. It has a disadvantage in that it tends to make answers somewhat stereotyped. On the other hand, symmetry makes conditions the same for right and left handed subjects; furthermore, it facilitates interpretation for certain blocked subjects. Finally, symmetry makes possible the interpretation of whole scenes.

=== Exner scoring system ===
The Exner scoring system, also known as the Rorschach Comprehensive System (RCS), is the standard method for interpreting the Rorschach test. It was developed in the 1960s by John E. Exner, as a more rigorous system of analysis. It has been extensively validated and shows high inter-rater reliability. In 1969, Exner published The Rorschach Systems, a concise description of what would be later called "the Exner system". He later published a study in multiple volumes called The Rorschach: A Comprehensive system, the most accepted full description of his system.

Creation of the new system was prompted by the realization that at least five related, but ultimately different methods were in common use at the time, with a sizeable minority of examiners not employing any recognized method at all, basing instead their judgment on subjective assessment, or arbitrarily mixing characteristics of the various standardized systems.

The key components of the Exner system are the clusterization of Rorschach variables and a sequential search strategy to determine the order in which to analyze them, framed in the context of standardized administration, objective, reliable coding and a representative normative database. The system places a lot of emphasis on a cognitive triad of information processing, related to how the subject processes input data, cognitive mediation, referring to the way information is transformed and identified, and ideation.

In the system, responses are scored with reference to their level of vagueness or synthesis of multiple images in the blot, the location of the response, which of a variety of determinants is used to produce the response (i.e., what makes the inkblot look like what it is said to resemble), the form quality of the response (to what extent a response is faithful to how the actual inkblot looks), the contents of the response (what the respondent actually sees in the blot), the degree of mental organizing activity that is involved in producing the response, and any illogical, incongruous, or incoherent aspects of responses. "Bat" is a popular response to the first card.

Using the scores for these categories, the examiner then performs a series of calculations producing a structural summary of the test data. The results of the structural summary are interpreted using existing research data on personality characteristics that have been demonstrated to be associated with different kinds of responses.

With the Rorschach plates (the ten inkblots), the area of each blot which is distinguished by the client is noted and coded—typically as "commonly selected" or "uncommonly selected". There were many different methods for coding the areas of the blots. Exner settled upon the area coding system promoted by S. J. Beck (1944 and 1961). This system was in turn based upon Klopfer's (1942) work.

As pertains to response form, a concept of "form quality" was present from the earliest of Rorschach's works, as a subjective judgment of how well the form of the subject's response matched the inkblots (Rorschach would give a higher form score to more "original" yet good form responses), and this concept was followed by other methods, especially in Europe; in contrast, the Exner system solely defines "good form" as a matter of word occurrence frequency, reducing it to a measure of the subject's distance to the population average.

=== Performance assessment system (R-PAS) ===
Rorschach performance assessment system (R-PAS) is a scoring method created by several members of the Rorschach Research Council. They believed that the Exner scoring system was in need of an update, but after Exner's death, the Exner family forbade any changes to be made to the Comprehensive System. Therefore, they established a new system: the R-PAS. It is an attempt at creating a current, empirically based, and internationally focused scoring system that is easier to use than Exner's Comprehensive System. The R-PAS manual is intended to be a comprehensive tool for administering, scoring, and interpreting the Rorschach. The manual consists of two chapters that are basics of scoring and interpretation, aimed for use for novice Rorschach users, followed by numerous chapters containing more detailed and technical information.

In terms of updated scoring, the authors only selected variables that have been empirically supported in the literature. The authors did not create new variables or indices to be coded, but systematically reviewed variables that had been used in past systems. While all of these codes have been used in the past, many have been renamed to be more face valid and readily understood. Scoring of the indices has been updated (e.g. utilizing percentiles and standard scores) to make the Rorschach more in line with other popular personality measures. Preliminary evidence suggests that the R-PAS exhibits good inter-rater reliability.

In addition to providing coding guidelines to score examinee responses, the R-PAS provides a system to code an examinee's behavior during Rorschach administration. These behavioral codes are included as it is believed that the behaviors exhibited during testing are a reflection of someone's task performance and supplements the actual responses given. This allows generalizations to be made between someone's responses to the cards and their actual behavior.

The R-PAS also recognized that scoring on many of the Rorschach variables differed across countries. Therefore, starting in 1997, Rorschach protocols from researchers around the world were compiled. After compiling protocols for over a decade, a total of 15 adult samples were used to provide a normative basis for the R-PAS. The protocols represent data gathered in the United States, Europe, Israel, Argentina and Brazil.

=== Cultural differences ===
Comparing North American Exner normative data with data from European and South American subjects showed marked differences in some features, some of which impact important variables, while others (such as the average number of responses) coincide. For instance, texture response is typically zero in European subjects (if interpreted as a need for closeness, in accordance with the system, a European would seem to express it only when it reaches the level of a craving for closeness), and there are fewer "good form" responses, to the point where schizophrenia may be suspected if data were correlated to the North American norms. Form is also often the only determinant expressed by European subjects; while color is less frequent than in American subjects, color-form responses are comparatively frequent in opposition to form-color responses; since the latter tend to be interpreted as indicators of a defensive attitude in processing affect, this difference could stem from a higher value attributed to spontaneous expression of emotions.

The differences in form quality are attributable to purely cultural aspects: different cultures will exhibit different "common" objects (French subjects often identify a chameleon in card VIII, which is normally classed as an "unusual" response, as opposed to other animals like cats and dogs; in Scandinavia, "Christmas elves" (nisser) is a popular response for card II, and "musical instrument" on card VI is popular for Japanese people), and different languages will exhibit semantic differences in naming the same object (the figure of card IV is often called a troll by Scandinavians and an ogre by French people). Many of Exner's "popular" responses (those given by at least one third of the North American sample used) seem to be universally popular, as shown by samples in Europe, Japan and South America, while specifically card IX's "human" response, the crab or spider in card X and one of either the butterfly or the bat in card I appear to be characteristic of North America.

Form quality, popular content responses and locations are the only coded variables in the Exner systems that are based on frequency of occurrence, and thus immediately subject to cultural influences; therefore, cultural-dependent interpretation of test data may not necessarily need to extend beyond these components.

The cited language differences can result in misinterpretation if not administered in the subject's native language or a very well mastered second language, and interpreted by a master speaker of that language. For example, a bow tie is a frequent response for the center detail of card III, but since the equivalent term in French translates to "butterfly tie", an examiner not appreciating this language nuance may code the response differently from what is expected.

== Usage ==
=== United States ===
The Rorschach test is used almost exclusively by psychologists. Up to 2007 forensic psychologists used the Rorschach 36% of the time. In custody cases, 23% of psychologists use the Rorschach to examine a child. Another survey found that 124 out of 161 (77%) of clinical psychologists engaging in assessment services utilize the Rorschach, and 80% of psychology graduate programs teach its use. Another study found that its use by clinical psychologists was only 43%, while it was used less than 24% of the time by school psychologists.

During World War II, United States Army Medical Corps chief psychiatrist Douglas Kelley and psychologist Gustave Gilbert administered the Rorschach test to the 22 defendants in the Nazi leadership group prior to the first Nuremberg trials, and the test scores were published some decades later.

Because of the large amount of data used to interpret the test, psychologist Zygmunt Piotrowski began work to computerize ink blot interpretation in the 1950s and 1960s. This work included over 1,000 rules and included no summary nor narrative conclusions. A subsequent computerized interpretation of Rorschach test scores, that included summary and conclusions was developed in the 1970s by psychologists Perline and Cabanski, and marketed internationally. This computerized interpretation of the test was used to interpret the set of scores developed by Gilbert on Nazi Hermann Goering along with several other Nazis while awaiting trial at Nuremberg Prison.

In the 1980s psychologist John Exner developed a computerized interpretation of the Rorschach test, based on his own scoring system, the Exner Comprehensive System. Presently, of the three computerized assessments, only the Exner system is available on the market.

The arguments for or against computerized assessment of the Rorschach is likely to remain unresolved for some time, as there is no absolute correct interpretation against which the different markers (scores) denoting mental health can be compared. Although scores for a theoretically typical healthy adult have been proposed and reasonable attempts to standardize the computer interpretation against these scores have been obtained, more work in this area needs to be done.

=== United Kingdom ===
Many psychologists in the United Kingdom do not trust its efficacy and it is rarely used. Although skeptical about its scientific validity, some psychologists use it in therapy and coaching "as a way of encouraging self-reflection and starting a conversation about the person's internal world." It is still used, however, by some mental health organisations such as the Tavistock Clinic. In a survey done in the year 2000, 20% of psychologists in correctional facilities used the Rorschach while 80% used the MMPI.

=== Japan ===
Shortly after the publication of Rorschach's book, Japanese psychologist Yuzaburo Uchida came across a copy in a second-hand book shop. His positive reaction created an enduring popularity for the tests in Japan. The Japanese Rorschach Society is the world's largest and the test is "routinely put to a wide range of purposes", being described in 2012 as "more popular than ever".

== Inkblots ==
Below are the ten inkblots printed in Rorschach Test – Psychodiagnostic Plates, together with the most frequent responses for either the whole image or the most prominent details according to various authors.

Card
Popular responses
Comments
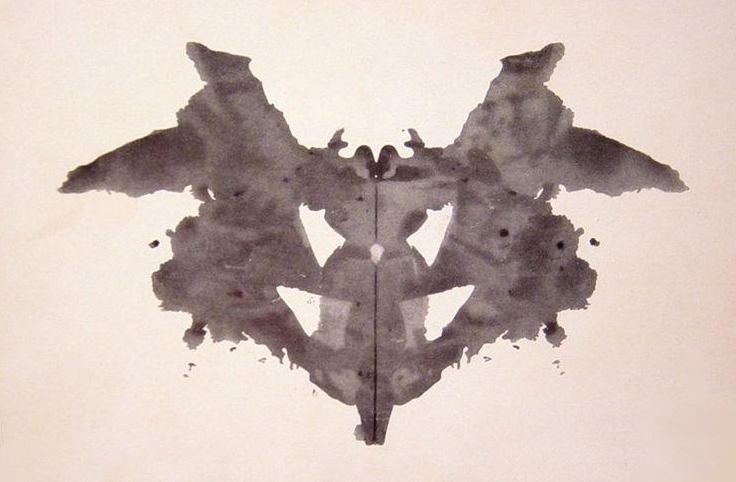

Beck:	bat, butterfly, moth
Piotrowski:	bat (53%), butterfly (29%)
Dana (France):	butterfly (39%)

When seeing card I, subjects often inquire on how they should proceed, and questions on what they are allowed to do with the card (e.g. turning it) are not very significant. Being the first card, it can provide clues about how subjects tackle a new and stressful task. It is not, however, a card that is usually difficult for the subject to handle, having readily available popular responses.
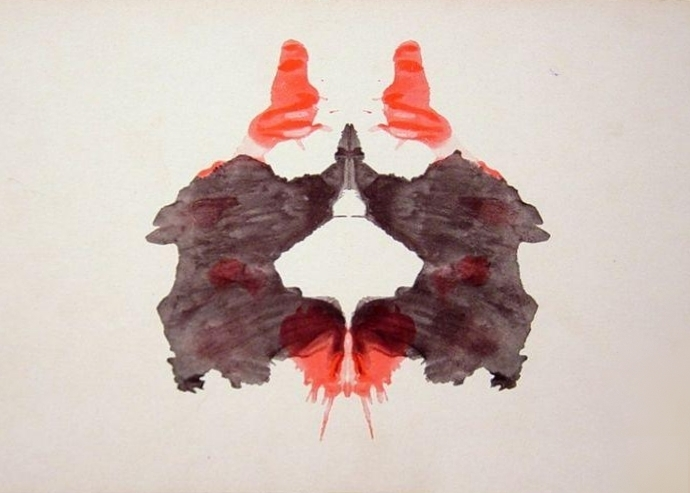

Beck:	two humans
Piotrowski:	four-legged animal (34%, gray parts)
Dana (France):	animal: dog, elephant, bear (50%, gray)

The red details of card II are often seen as blood, and are the most distinctive features. Responses to them can provide indications about how a subject is likely to manage feelings of anger or physical harm. This card can induce a variety of sexual responses.
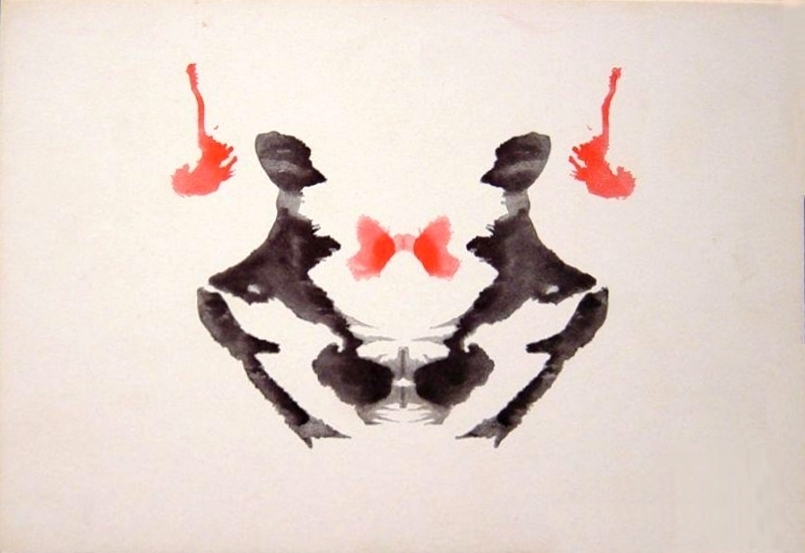

Beck:	two humans (gray)
Piotrowski:	human figures (72%, gray)
Dana (France):	human (76%, gray)

Card III is typically perceived to contain two humans involved in some interaction, and may provide information about how the subject relates with other people (specifically, response latency may reveal struggling social interactions).
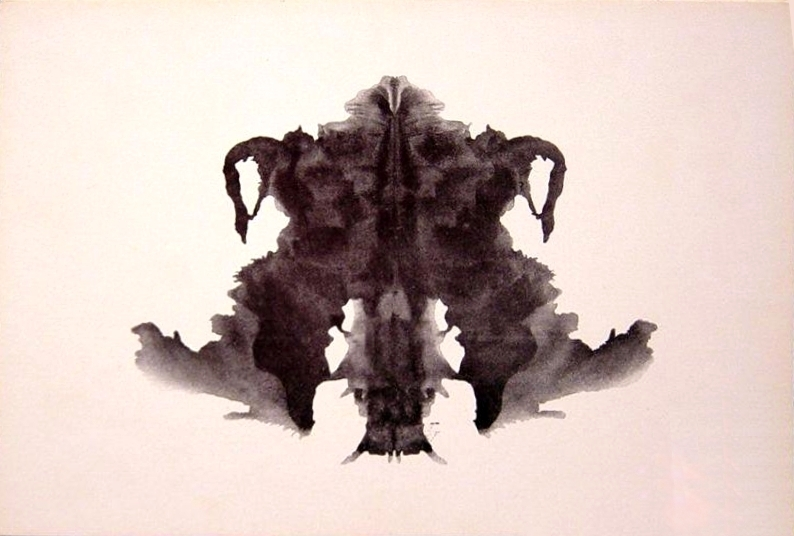

Beck:	animal hide, skin, rug
Piotrowski:	animal skin, skin rug (41%)
Dana (France):	animal skin (46%)

Card IV is notable for its dark color and its shading (posing difficulties for depressed subjects), and is generally perceived as a big and sometimes threatening figure; compounded with the common impression of the subject being in an inferior position ("looking up") to it, this serves to elicit a sense of authority. The human or animal content seen in the card is almost invariably classified as male rather than female, and the qualities expressed by the subject may indicate attitudes toward men and authority. Because of this Card IV has been called "The Father Card".
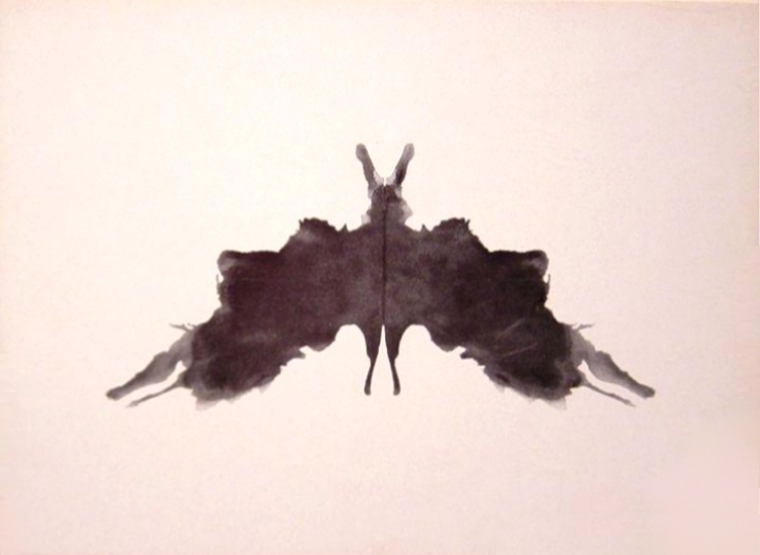

Beck:	bat, butterfly, moth
Piotrowski:	butterfly (48%), bat (40%)
Dana (France):	butterfly (48%), bat (46%)

Card V is an easily elaborated card that is not usually perceived as threatening, and typically instigates a "change of pace" in the test, after the previous more challenging cards. Containing few features that generate concerns or complicate the elaboration, it is the easiest blot to generate a good quality response about.
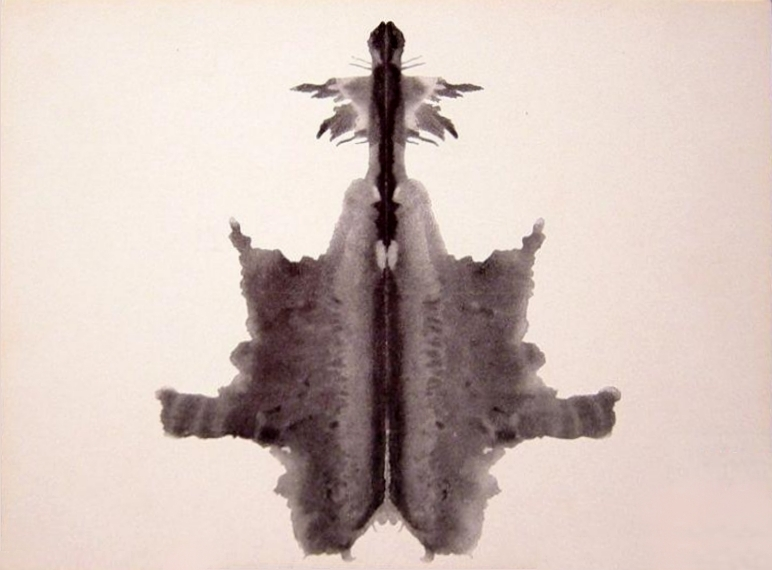

Beck:	animal hide, skin, rug
Piotrowski:	animal skin, skin rug (41%)
Dana (France):	animal skin (46%)

Texture is the dominant characteristic of card VI, which often elicits association related to interpersonal closeness; it is specifically a "sex card", its likely sexual percepts being reported more frequently than in any other card, even though other cards have a greater variety of commonly seen sexual contents.
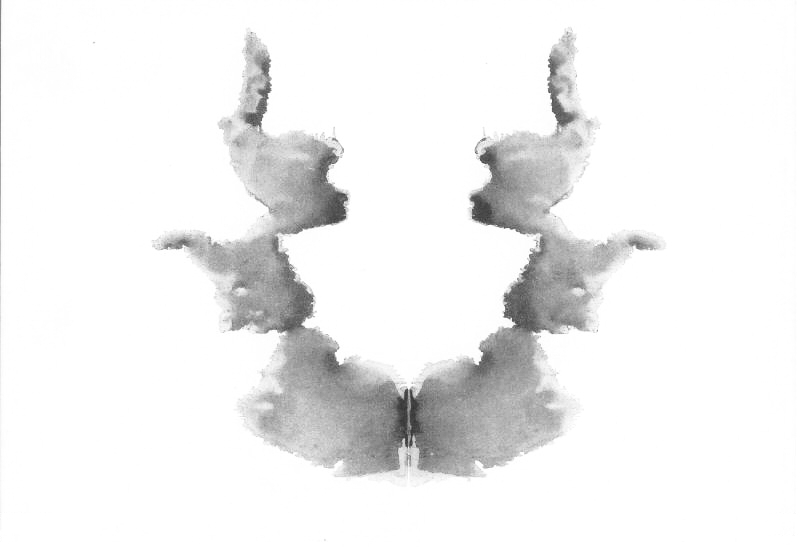

Beck:	human heads or faces (top)
Piotrowski:	heads of women or children (27%, top)
Dana (France):	human head (46%, top)

Card VII can be associated with femininity (the human figures commonly seen in it being described as women or children), where difficulties in responding may be related to concerns with the female figures in the subject's life. The center detail is relatively often (though not popularly) identified as a vagina, which makes this card also relate to feminine sexuality in particular. Because of this Card VII has been called "The Mother Card".
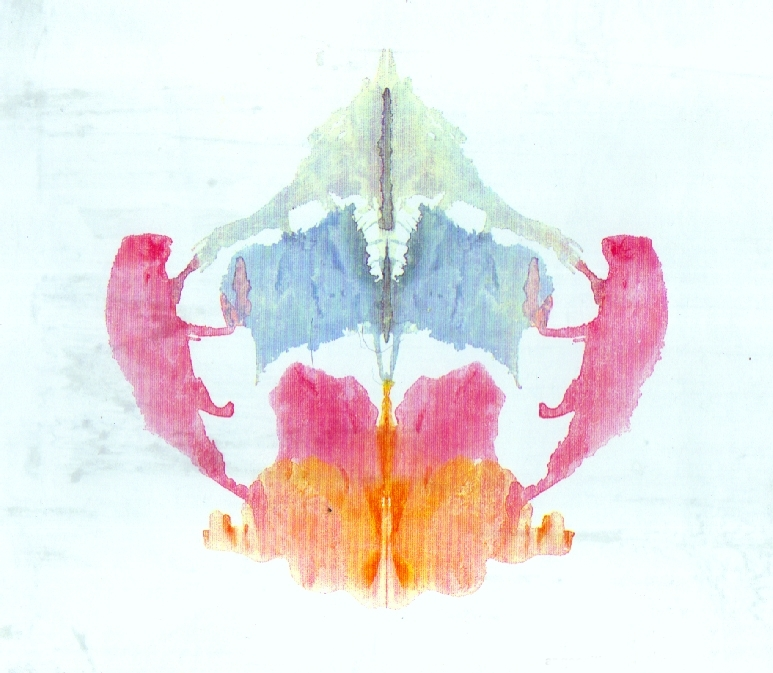

Beck:	animal: not cat or dog (pink)
Piotrowski:	four-legged animal (94%, pink)
Dana (France):	four-legged animal (93%, pink)

People often express relief about card VIII, which lets them relax and respond effectively. Similar to card V, it represents a "change of pace"; however, the card introduces new elaboration difficulties, being complex and the first multi-colored card in the set. Therefore, people who find processing complex situations or emotional stimuli distressing or difficult may be uncomfortable with this card.
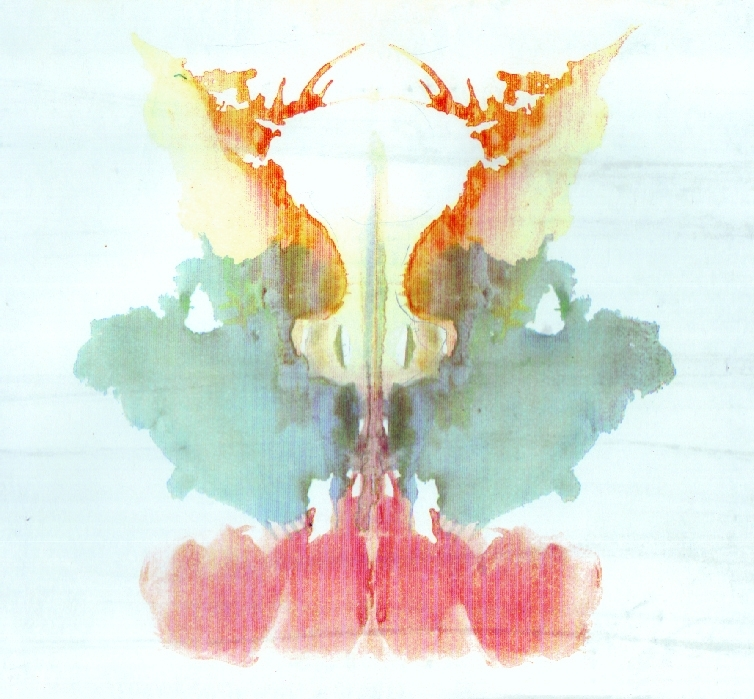

Beck:	human (orange)
Piotrowski:	none
Dana (France):	none

Characteristic of card IX is indistinct form and diffuse, muted chromatic features, creating a general vagueness. There is only one popular response, and it is the least frequent of all cards. Having difficulty with processing this card may indicate trouble dealing with unstructured data, but aside from this there are few particular "pulls" typical of this card.
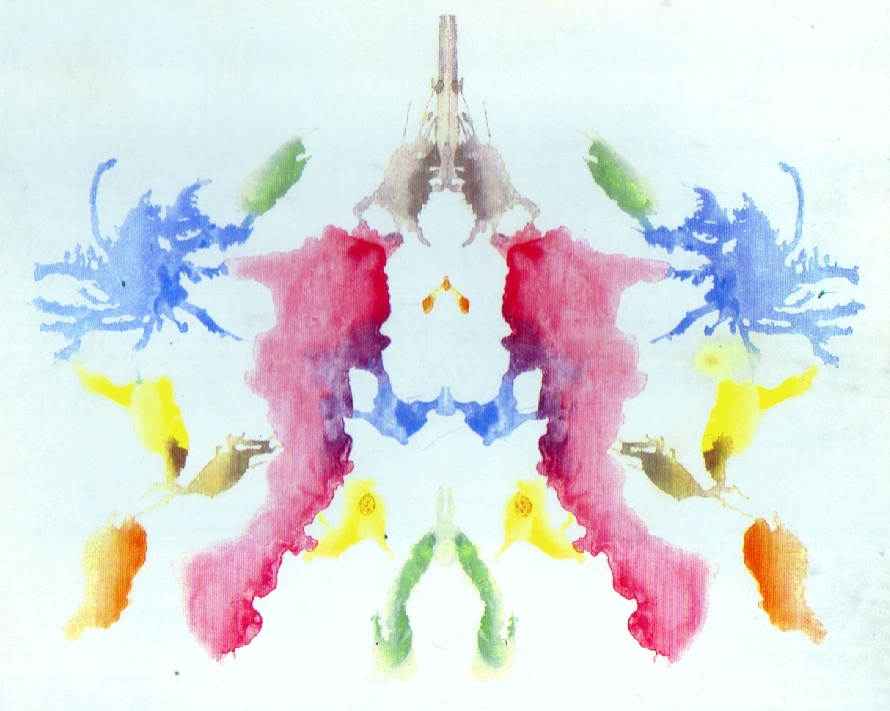

Beck:	crab, lobster, spider (blue)
Piotrowski:	crab, spider (37%, blue), rabbit head (31%, light green), caterpillars, worms, snakes (28%, deep green)
Dana (France):	none

Card X is structurally similar to card VIII, but its uncertainty and complexity are reminiscent of card IX: people who find it difficult to deal with many concurrent stimuli may not particularly like this otherwise pleasant card. Being the last card, it may provide an opportunity for the subject to "sign out" by indicating what they feel their situation is like, or what they desire to know.

== Controversy ==
Some skeptics consider the Rorschach inkblot test pseudoscience, as several studies suggested that conclusions reached by test administrators since the 1950s were akin to cold reading. In the 1959 edition of Mental Measurement Yearbook, Lee Cronbach (former President of the Psychometric Society and American Psychological Association) is quoted in a review: "The test has repeatedly failed as a prediction of practical criteria. There is nothing in the literature to encourage reliance on Rorschach interpretations." In addition, major reviewer Raymond J. McCall writes (p. 154): "Though tens of thousands of Rorschach tests have been administered by hundreds of trained professionals since that time (of a previous review), and while many relationships to personality dynamics and behavior have been hypothesized, the vast majority of these relationships have never been validated empirically, despite the appearance of more than 2,000 publications about the test." A moratorium on its use was called for in 1999.

A 2003 report by Wood and colleagues had more mixed views: "More than 50 years of research have confirmed Lee J. Cronbach's (1970) final verdict: that some Rorschach scores, though falling woefully short of the claims made by proponents, nevertheless possess 'validity greater than chance' (p. 636). [...] Its value as a measure of thought disorder in schizophrenia research is well accepted. It is also used regularly in research on dependency, and, less often, in studies on hostility and anxiety. Furthermore, substantial evidence justifies the use of the Rorschach as a clinical measure of intelligence and thought disorder."

=== Test materials ===
The basic premise of the test is that objective meaning can be extracted from responses to blots of ink which are supposedly meaningless. Supporters of the Rorschach inkblot test believe that the subject's response to an ambiguous and meaningless stimulus can provide insight into their thought processes, but it is not clear how this occurs. Also, recent research shows that the blots are not entirely meaningless, and that a patient typically responds to meaningful as well as ambiguous aspects of the blots. Reber (1985) describes the blots as merely "the vehicle for the interaction" between client and therapist, concluding that "the usefulness of the Rorschach will depend upon the sensitivity, empathy and insightfulness of the tester totally independently of the Rorschach itself. An intense dialogue about the wallpaper or the rug would do as well provided that both parties believe."

=== Illusory and invisible correlations ===
In the 1960s, research by psychologists Loren and Jean Chapman, at the University of Wisconsin, published in the Journal of Abnormal Psychology, showed that at least some of the apparent validity of the Rorschach was due to an illusion. At that time, the five signs most often interpreted as diagnostic of homosexuality were 1) buttocks and anuses; 2) feminine clothing; 3) male or female sex organs; 4) human figures without male or female features; and 5) human figures with both male and female features. The Chapmans surveyed 32 experienced testers about their use of the Rorschach to diagnose homosexuality. At this time homosexuality was regarded as a psychopathology, and the Rorschach was the most popular projective test. The testers reported that homosexual men had shown the five signs more frequently than heterosexual men. Despite these beliefs, analysis of the results showed that heterosexual men were just as likely to report these signs, which were therefore totally ineffective for determining homosexuality. The five signs did, however, match the guesses students made about which imagery would be associated with homosexuality.

The Chapmans investigated the source of the testers' false confidence. In one experiment, students read through a stack of cards, each with a Rorschach blot, a sign and a pair of "conditions" (which might include homosexuality). The information on the cards was fictional, although subjects were told it came from case studies of real patients. The students reported that the five invalid signs were associated with homosexuality, even though the cards had been constructed so there was no association at all. The Chapmans repeated this experiment with another set of cards, in which the association was negative; the five signs were never reported by homosexuals. The students still reported seeing a strong positive correlation. These experiments showed that the testers' prejudices could result in them "seeing" non-existent relationships in the data. The Chapmans called this phenomenon "illusory correlation" and it has since been demonstrated in many other contexts.

A related phenomenon called "invisible correlation" applies when people fail to see a strong association between two events because it does not match their expectations. This was also found in clinicians' interpretations of the Rorschach. Homosexual men are more likely to see a monster on Card IV or a part-animal, part-human figure in Card V. Almost all of the experienced clinicians in the Chapmans' survey missed these valid signs. The Chapmans ran an experiment with fake Rorschach responses in which these valid signs were always associated with homosexuality. The subjects missed these perfect associations and instead reported that invalid signs, such as buttocks or feminine clothing, were better indicators.

In 1992, the psychologist Stuart Sutherland argued that these artificial experiments are easier than the real-world use of the Rorschach, and hence they probably underestimated the errors that testers were susceptible to. He described the continuing popularity of the Rorschach after the Chapmans' research as a "glaring example of irrationality among psychologists".

=== Tester projection ===
Some critics argue that the testing psychologist must also project onto the patterns. A possible example sometimes attributed to the psychologist's subjective judgement is that responses are coded (among many other things), for "Form Quality": in essence, whether the subject's response fits with how the blot actually looks. Superficially this might be considered a subjective judgment, depending on how the examiner has internalized the categories involved. But with the Exner system of scoring, much of the subjectivity is eliminated or reduced by use of frequency tables that indicate how often a particular response is given by the population in general. Another example is that the response "bra" was considered a "sex" response by male psychologists, but a "clothing" response by females. In Exner's system, however, such a response is always coded as "clothing" unless there is a clear sexual reference in the response.

Third parties could be used to avoid this problem, but the Rorschach's inter-rater reliability has been questioned. That is, in some studies the scores obtained by two independent scorers do not match with great consistency. This conclusion was challenged in studies using large samples reported in 2002.

=== Validity ===
When interpreted as a projective test, results are poorly verifiable. The Exner system of scoring (also known as the "Comprehensive System") is meant to address this, and has all but displaced many earlier (and less consistent) scoring systems. It makes heavy use of what factor (shading, color, outline, etc.) of the inkblot leads to each of the tested person's comments. Disagreements about test validity remain: while Exner proposed a rigorous scoring system, latitude remained in the actual interpretation, and the clinician's write-up of the test record is still partly subjective. Reber (1985) comments "... there is essentially no evidence whatsoever that the test has even a shred of validity."

Nevertheless, there is substantial research indicating the utility of the measure for a few scores. Several scores correlate well with general intelligence. One such scale is R, the total number of responses; this reveals the questionable side-effect that more intelligent people tend to be elevated on many pathology scales, since many scales do not correct for high R: if a subject gives twice as many responses overall, it is more likely that some of these will seem "pathological". Also correlated with intelligence are the scales for Organizational Activity, Complexity, Form Quality, and Human Figure responses. The same source reports that validity has also been shown for detecting such conditions as schizophrenia and other psychotic disorders; thought disorders; and personality disorders (including borderline personality disorder). There is some evidence that the Deviant Verbalizations scale relates to bipolar disorder. The authors conclude that "Otherwise, the Comprehensive System doesn't appear to bear a consistent relationship to psychological disorders or symptoms, personality characteristics, potential for violence, or such health problems as cancer". (Cancer is mentioned because a small minority of Rorschach enthusiasts have claimed the test can predict cancer.)

=== Reliability ===
It is also thought that the test's reliability can depend substantially on details of the testing procedure, such as where the tester and subject are seated, any introductory words, verbal and nonverbal responses to subjects' questions or comments, and how responses are recorded. Exner has published detailed instructions, but Wood et al. cite many court cases where these had not been followed. Similarly, the procedures for coding responses are fairly well specified but extremely time-consuming leaving them very subject to the author's style and the publisher to the quality of the instructions (such as was noted with one of Bohm's textbooks in the 1950s) as well as clinic workers (which would include examiners) being encouraged to cut corners.

United States courts have challenged the Rorschach as well. Jones v Apfel (1997) stated (quoting from Attorney's Textbook of Medicine) that Rorschach "results do not meet the requirements of standardization, reliability, or validity of clinical diagnostic tests, and interpretation thus is often controversial". In State ex rel H.H. (1999) where under cross-examination Bogacki stated under oath "many psychologists do not believe much in the validity or effectiveness of the Rorschach test" and US v Battle (2001) ruled that the Rorschach "does not have an objective scoring system."

=== Population norms ===
Another controversial aspect of the test is its statistical norms. Exner's system was thought to possess normative scores for various populations. But, beginning in the mid-1990s others began to try to replicate or update these norms and failed. In particular, discrepancies seemed to focus on indices measuring narcissism, disordered thinking, and discomfort in close relationships. Lilienfeld and colleagues, who are critical of the Rorschach, have stated that this proves that the Rorschach tends to "overpathologise normals". Although Rorschach proponents, such as Hibbard, suggest that high rates of pathology detected by the Rorschach accurately reflect increasing psychopathology in society, the Rorschach also identifies half of all test-takers as possessing "distorted thinking", a false positive rate unexplained by current research.

The accusation of "over-pathologising" has also been considered by Meyer et al. (2007). They presented an international collaborative study of 4704 Rorschach protocols, obtained in 21 different samples, across 17 countries, with only 2% showing significant elevations on the index of perceptual and thinking disorder, 12% elevated on indices of depression and hyper-vigilance and 13% elevated on persistent stress overload—all in line with expected frequencies among non-patient populations.

=== Applications ===
The test is also controversial because of its common use in court-ordered evaluations. This controversy stems, in part, from the limitations of the Rorschach, with no additional data, in making official diagnoses from the Diagnostic and Statistical Manual of Mental Disorders (DSM-IV). Irving B. Weiner (co-developer with John Exner of the Comprehensive system) has stated that the Rorschach "is a measure of personality functioning, and it provides information concerning aspects of personality structure and dynamics that make people the kind of people they are. Sometimes such information about personality characteristics is helpful in arriving at a differential diagnosis, if the alternative diagnoses being considered have been well conceptualized with respect to specific or defining personality characteristics". In the vast majority of cases, anyway, the Rorschach test was not singled out but used as one of several in a battery of tests, and despite the criticism of usage of the Rorschach in the courts, out of 8,000 cases in which forensic psychologists used Rorschach-based testimony, the appropriateness of the instrument was challenged only six times, and the testimony was ruled inadmissible in only one of those cases. One study has found that use of the test in courts has increased by three times in the decade between 1996 and 2005, compared to the previous fifty years. Others however have found that its usage by forensic psychologists has decreased.

Exner and others have claimed that the Rorschach test is capable of detecting suicidality.

=== Protection of test items and ethics ===
Psychologists object to the publication of psychological test material out of concerns that a patient's test responses will be influenced ("primed") by previous exposure. The Canadian Psychological Association takes the position that, "Publishing the questions and answers to any psychological test compromises its usefulness" and calls for "keeping psychological tests out of the public domain." The same statement quotes their president as saying, "The CPA's concern is not with the publication of the cards and responses to the Rorschach test per se, for which there is some controversy in the psychological literature and disagreement among experts, but with the larger issue of the publication and dissemination of psychological test content".

From a legal standpoint, the Rorschach test images have been in the public domain for many years in most countries, particularly those with a copyright term of up to 70 years post mortem auctoris. They have been in the public domain in Hermann Rorschach's native Switzerland since 1992 (70 years after the author's death, or 50 years after the cut-off date of 1942), according to Swiss copyright law. They are also in the public domain under United States copyright law where all works published before 1923 are considered to be in the public domain. This means that the Rorschach images may be used by anyone for any purpose. William Poundstone was, perhaps, first to make them public in his 1983 book Big Secrets, where he also described the method of administering the test.

The American Psychological Association (APA) has a code of ethics that supports "freedom of inquiry and expression" and helping "the public in developing informed judgments". It claims that its goals include "the welfare and protection of the individuals and groups with whom psychologists work", and it requires that psychologists "make reasonable efforts to maintain the integrity and security of test materials". The APA has also raised concerns that the dissemination of test materials might impose "very concrete harm to the general public". It has not taken a position on publication of the Rorschach plates but noted "there are a limited number of standardized psychological tests considered appropriate for a given purpose". A public statement by the British Psychological Society expresses similar concerns about psychological tests (without mentioning any test by name) and considers the "release of [test] materials to unqualified individuals" to be misuse if it is against the wishes of the test publisher. In his 1998 book Ethics in Psychology, Gerald Koocher notes that some believe "reprinting copies of the Rorschach plates ... and listing common responses represents a serious unethical act" for psychologists and is indicative of "questionable professional judgment". Another association, the Associazione Italiana di Psicoterapia Strategica Integrata (literally: Italian Association of Strategic Psychotherapy), recommend that even information about the purpose of the test or any detail of its administration should be kept from the public, even though "cheating" the test is held to be practically impossible.

On September 9, 2008, Hogrefe attempted to claim copyright over the Rorschach ink blots during filings of a complaint with the World Intellectual Property Organization against the Brazilian psychologist Ney Limonge. These complaints were denied. Further complaints were sent to two other websites that contained information similar to the Rorschach test in May 2009 by legal firm Schluep and Degen of Switzerland.

Psychologists have sometimes refused to disclose tests and test data to courts when asked to do so by the parties, citing ethical reasons; it is argued that such refusals may hinder full understanding of the process by the attorneys, and impede cross-examination of the experts. APA ethical standard 1.23(b) states that the psychologist has a responsibility to document processes in detail and of adequate quality to allow reasonable scrutiny by the court.

Controversy ensued in the psychological community in 2009 when the original Rorschach plates and research results on interpretations were published in the "Rorschach test" article on Wikipedia. Hogrefe & Huber Publishing, a German company that sells editions of the plates, called the publication "unbelievably reckless and even cynical of Wikipedia" and said it was investigating the possibility of legal action. Due to this controversy an edit filter was temporarily established on Wikipedia to prevent the removal of the plates.

James Heilman, an emergency room physician involved in the debate, compared it to the publication of the eye test chart: though people are likewise free to memorize the eye chart before an eye test, its general usefulness as a diagnostic tool for eyesight has not diminished. For those opposed to exposure, publication of the inkblots is described as a "particularly painful development", given the tens of thousands of research papers which have, over many years, "tried to link a patient's responses to certain psychological conditions." Controversy over Wikipedia's publication of the inkblots has resulted in the blots being published in other locations, such as The Guardian and The Globe and Mail. Later that year, in August 2009, two psychologists filed a complaint against Heilman with the Saskatchewan medical licensing board, arguing that his uploading of the images constituted unprofessional behavior. In 2012, two articles were published showing consequences of the publication of the images in Wikipedia. The first one studied negative attitudes towards the test generated during the Wikipedia-Rorschach debate, while the second suggested that reading the Wikipedia article could help to fake "good" results in the test.

Publication of the Rorschach images is also welcomed by critics who consider the test to be pseudoscience. Benjamin Radford, editor of Skeptical Inquirer magazine, stated that the Rorschach "has remained in use more out of tradition than good evidence" and was hopeful that publication of the test might finally hasten its demise.

== In art and media ==
Australian artist Ben Quilty has used the Rorschach technique in his paintings, by loading impasto oil paint onto a canvas and then pressing a second, unpainted, canvas onto the first, and proceeding to create an artwork from the shape created by this method.

The mask of the fictional antihero of the same name in the graphic novel limited series Watchmen and its adaptations displays a constantly morphing inkblot based on the designs used in the tests. In the 1999 Sofia Coppola movie The Virgin Suicides the character of Cecilia is given the test, in David Cronenberg's Spider (2002) the Rorschach inkblots are incorporated into the opening of the film, and in Robert Siodmak's The Dark Mirror (1946) the inkblots are incorporated into the title sequence and the characters Terry and Ruth are given the test.

In 2022, a Malayalam language film titled Rorschach was announced with actor Mammootty in the lead role, inspiring queries and discussion in social media about the test.

== See also ==
- Blacky pictures test
- Fumage, a surrealist art technique using smoke
- Holtzman inkblot technique, a similar inkblot test designed to correct the limitations of the Rorschach
- Picture arrangement test
- Thematic apperception test
