= Hermann Rorschach =

Swiss Freudian psychiatrist and psychoanalyst (1884–1922)

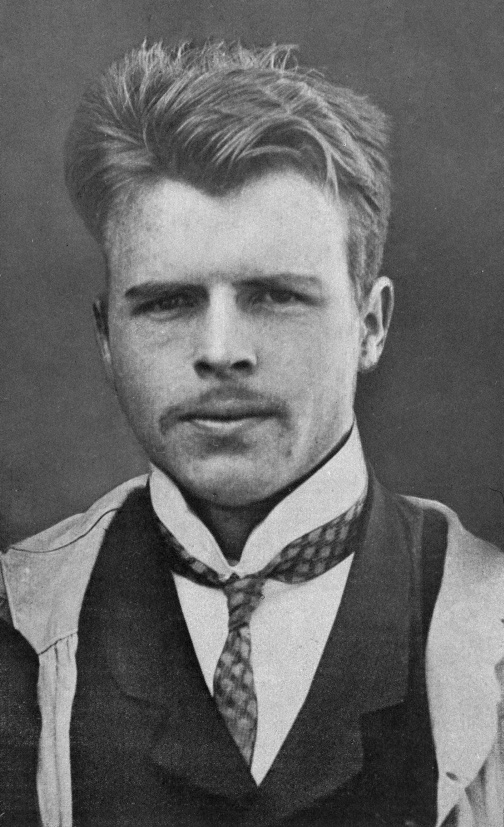
- Rorschach in 1910
- Born: 8 November 1884; Zürich, Switzerland
- Died: 2 April 1922 (aged 37); Herisau, Appenzell Ausserrhoden, Switzerland
- Known for: Rorschach test
- Spouse: Olga Stempelin (m. 1913)
- Children: 2
- Scientific career
- Fields: Psychiatry, psychometrics

Hermann Rorschach (Swiss Standard German: [ˈhɛrman ˈroːrʃaχ]; 8 November 1884 – 2 April 1922) was a Swiss psychiatrist and psychoanalyst. His education in art helped to spur the development of a set of inkblots that were used experimentally to measure various unconscious parts of the subject's personality. His method has come to be referred to as the Rorschach test, iterations of which have continued to be used over the years to help identify personality, psychotic, and neurological disorders. Rorschach continued to refine the test until his premature death at age 37.

== Early life ==
Rorschach was born in Zurich, Switzerland, the eldest of three children born to Ulrich and Philippine Rorschach. He had one sister, Anna, and one brother, Paul. He spent his childhood and youth in Schaffhausen, in northern Switzerland. He was known to his school friends and in his fraternity (Scaphusia) as Klex, or "inkblot" since he enjoyed klecksography, the making of fanciful inkblot "pictures". By the time of Rorschach's youth, consideration of the projective significance of inkblots already had some historical context. For example, in 1857, German doctor Justinus Kerner had published a popular book of poems, each of which was inspired by an accidental inkblot. It has been speculated that the book was known to Rorschach. French psychologist Alfred Binet had also experimented with inkblots as a creativity test.

Rorschach's father, an art teacher, encouraged him to express himself creatively through painting and drawing conventional pictures. As the time of Rorschach's high-school graduation approached, he could not decide between a career in art and one in science. He wrote a letter to the German biologist Ernst Haeckel asking his advice. A major factor that led Rorschach to differ from his father and not pursue art was that his father died while he was still trying to decide what to study.

== Education and career ==
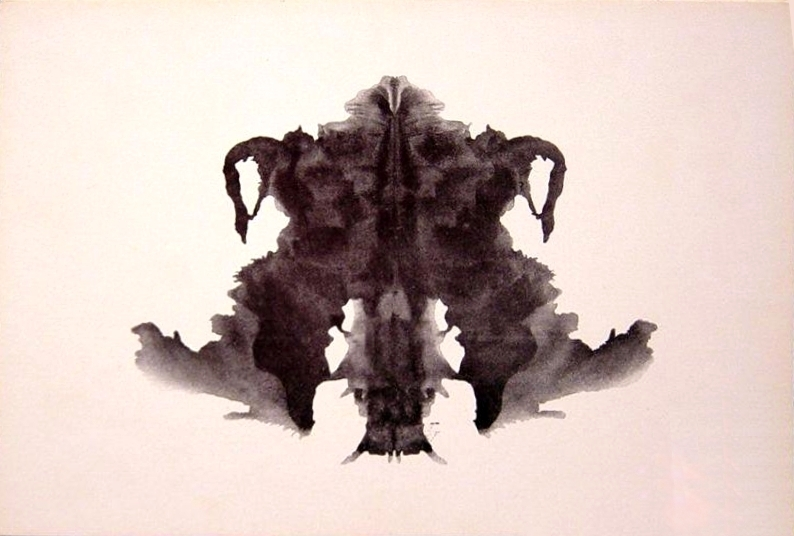
An inkblot used in Rorschach testing

Rorschach, in his early years, attended Schaffhausen Cantonal School in Schaffhausen, Switzerland. Rorschach was a bright student from the beginning, and he often tutored other students at his school. After Ernst Haeckel suggested a career in science, Rorschach attended Académie de Neuchâtel in 1904 studying geology and botany. After just a single term, he transferred to the Université de Dijon to take French classes. The same year he enrolled in medical school at the University of Zurich. While studying, Rorschach began learning Russian, and in 1906, while studying in Berlin, he traveled to Russia for a holiday.

Travel was a large part of his life after medical school. On a trip to Dijon, in France, he met a man who taught him about Russian culture. Torn by the decision of whether to stay in Switzerland or move to Russia, he eventually took a job as first assistant at a Cantonal Mental Hospital. His work as a psychiatrist and stay at the Mental Hospital led to his development of the Rorschach test and his categorization of mental states. While working at the hospital, Rorschach finished his doctoral dissertation in 1912 under the psychiatrist Eugen Bleuler, who had taught Carl Jung. The excitement in intellectual circles over psychoanalysis constantly reminded Rorschach of his childhood inkblots. Wondering why different people often saw entirely different things in the same inkblots, he began, while still a medical student, showing inkblots to schoolchildren and analyzing their responses. This dissertation contained the origins for his ink blot experiment.

All the while, Rorschach remained fascinated by Russian culture. In 1913, he obtained a fellowship opportunity in Russia, where he continued to study contemporary psychiatric methods. Rorschach spent some time in the village of Kryukovo outside of Moscow, and in 1914 he returned to Switzerland to work at the Waldau University Hospital in Bern, part of the University Psychiatric Services Bern. In 1915, Rorschach took the position of assistant director at the regional psychiatric hospital at Herisau, and in 1921 he wrote his book Psychodiagnostik, which was to form the basis of the inkblot test.

== Personal life ==
Rorschach graduated in medicine at Zurich in 1909 and at the same time became engaged to Olga Stempelin, a woman from Kazan (in present-day Russia). The couple were married in 1913 and lived in Russia until their return to Switzerland, for Rorschach's work, in 1915. They had two children, a daughter Elizabeth (called "Lisa", 1917–2006) and a son, Ulrich Wadin (called "Wadim", 1919–2010). Neither Lisa nor Wadim had children.

One year after writing Psychodiagnostik, Rorschach died of peritonitis, probably resulting from a ruptured appendix. He was still associate director of the Herisau Hospital when he died, aged 37, on 2 April 1922.

== Legacy ==
In 2001 the inkblot test was criticised as pseudoscience and its use was declared controversial by Scientific American, as different psychologists drew different findings from the same data, suggesting their results were subjective rather than objective. In 2013 and 2015 two systematic reviews and meta-analyses were published that resulted in the criticism as pseudoscience being lifted. In November 2013, Google celebrated the 129th anniversary of Rorschach's birth with a Google Doodle showing an interpretation of his inkblot test. Aside from the MMPI, the Rorschach Inkblot Method has generated more published research than any other psychological personality measure.

The cover of The Essentials of Psycho-analysis by Sigmund Freud, published in the "Vintage Freud" series by Vintage Books in 2005, features artwork by Michael Salu based on a Rorschach Inkblot.

== Publications ==
- Rorschach, H. (1924). Manual for Rorschach Ink-blot Test. Chicago, IL: Stoelting
- Rorschach, H., Oberholzer, E. (1924). The Application of the Interpretation of Form to Psychoanalysis. Chicago.
- Rorschach, H., Beck, S.J. (1932). The Rorschach Test as Applied to a Feeble-minded Group. New York.
- Rorschach, H., Klopfer, B. (1938). Rorschach Research Exchange. New York.
- Rorschach, H. (1942). Psychodiagnostics: A diagnostic test based on perception (P. Lemkau & B. Kronenberg, Trans.). Berne, Switzerland: Hans Huber.
- Rorschach, H. (1948). Psychodiagnostik (tafeln): Psychodiagnostics (plates). Bern: Hans Huber; distributors for the United States: Grune and Stratton, New York, N.Y.

== See also ==
- Emil Oberholzer
