= Leiter International Performance Scale =

Intelligence test

Leiter International Performance Scale or simply Leiter scale is an intelligence test in the form of a strict performance scale. It was designed for children and adolescents ages 2 to 18, although it can yield an intelligence quotient (IQ) and a measure of logical ability for all ages. The Leiter series of assessments have been produced and published by Stoelting.

== Background ==
Leiter devised an experimental edition of the test in 1929 to assess the intelligence of those with hearing or speech impairment and with non English speaking examinees. This test purports to "provide a nonverbal measure of general intelligence by sampling a wide variety of functions from memory to nonverbal reasoning." A remarkable feature of the Leiter scale is that it can be administered completely without the use of oral language, including instructions, and requires no verbal response from the participant. Without any verbal subtests, the Leiter scale only measures nonverbal intelligence. Because of the exclusion of language, it claims to be more accurate than other tests when testing children who cannot or will not provide a verbal response. This includes children with any of these features: Non native speaking, autism, traumatic brain injury, speech impairment, and hearing problems.

The Leiter scale was mainly used as a nonverbal alternative to the Binet scale, which is verbally weighted. However, it is also used by researchers, and also very frequently by clinicians who assess the "intellectual function of children with pervasive developmental disorders."

== Latest version ==
The latest version of Leiter is called Leiter-3, revised in 2013. It has an age range of 3 years to 75+ years. Not all subtests must be administered to every child. Although this scale does an excellent job as an "aid to clinical diagnosis in disabled children ... the test user must exercise caution in interpreting ... test results because the meaning of test scores requires more research." In a review by the Buros Center for Testing, an independent organization reviewing psychological and educational assessments, reviewers concluded that, "The Leiter-3 authors have succeeded in their goal of constructing a reliable and valid nonverbal measure of intellectual ability and attention/memory. Guided by feedback 20 from users of previous versions, the redesigned Leiter-3 is more engaging for examinees yet less time consuming for examiners while still providing several diagnostic indexes, scores, and interpretive options to guide program planning for a wide range of individuals."

The Leiter-3 was normed and validated with a diverse group, representative of the 2008 updated U.S. census, including a number of special groups, including those with speech impairments, deaf or hard-of-hearing, motor delays, traumatic brain injuries, intellectual delays, ADHD, giftedness, learning disabilities, autism spectrum disorder, and English as a Second Language.

The Leiter contains 10 subtests organized into four domains:

- Fluid Intelligence
- Visualization
- Memory
- Attention

== Subtests ==
The five Fluid Intelligence subtests are:

- Sequential Order,
- Form Completion,
- Figure Ground,
- Classification and Analogies, and
- Matching/Repeated Pattern - optional.

The five Attention and Memory subtests are:

- Forward Memory (FM),
- Attention Sustained (AS),
- Reverse Memory (RM),
- Nonverbal Stroop (NS), and
- Attention Divided (AD).

The last scale is the Social/Emotional scale, which gathers information on the following domains:

- Attention,
- Organization Skills,
- Impulse Control,
- Activity Level,
- Anxiety,
- Energy and Feelings,
- Mood Regulation,
- Sociability, and
- Sensory Reactivity.
