= Psychodiagnostik =

Psychodiagnostik (Psychodiagnostics) is a 174-page monograph written by Hermann Rorschach in 1921 containing the results of his studies on mental patients and 10 cards that became the foundation of the Rorschach test.

Based on the correspondence of Rorschach, available in Hermann Rorschach (1884–1922): Briefwechsel, the publishing process was a two-year undertaking.

A second edition was edited by Walter Morgenthaler and published in 1932.

In 1942, it was published in English as Psychodiagnostics: A Diagnostic Test Based on Perception.

== See also ==
- Psychoanalysis
