= Ecofont =

- Category: Display
- Designer: SPRANQ
- Foundry: SPRANQ
- Date created: 2009

Ecofont Software
- Developer: SPRANQ
- Website: www.ecofont.com

Ecofont is the name of a TrueType font family, an application program for Windows, and a Dutch business firm.

Ecofont Vera Sans (originally called Eco Sans) was developed by SPRANQ in the Netherlands in order to reduce ink consumption when printing. Each character in the font contains tiny holes. SPRANQ claims that this reduces the amount of ink needed by approximately 15 percent when compared to the Vera Sans family on which Ecofont Sans is based.

The Ecofont application program (formerly marketed as "Ecofont Professional") inserts small holes in other fonts in order to reduce ink consumption.

Both the software and the Ecofont Sans fonts are distributed and sold by Ecofont BV, based in Utrecht.

== History ==
Test of the "Eco Sans" font in comparison with the "Bitstream Vera sans" font

Ecofont Vera Sans was originally designed as an ink saving alternative to the Verdana typeface.

Ecofont Vera Sans saved 20% more ink when compared to Bitstream Vera Sans in a 2010 test. However, both sans-serif fonts used more ink than most typical serif fonts.

In 2011, Ecofont claimed that a reproducible test comparing Arial with Ecofont Arial showed ink savings of 28%.

A comparison of printing with different fonts until the ink ran out found that Ecofont Vera was similar to Century Gothic and less economical than Times New Roman. Garamond was significantly more economical, though it also sets smaller than other fonts at the same nominal point size.

== Awards ==
The Eco Sans font received the European Environmental Design Award 2010 from DiMAD in Spain.

Ecofont received the Accenture Innovation Award 2011 in the category Consumer Products, the Sprout Challenger Award in 2012 and the SMEs Innovation Top 100 in 2013.

== Other fonts designed for economy ==
Another font designed for ink economy using the same "hollow letter" concept is Ryman Eco.
