= William Poundstone =

American author, columnist, and skeptic

William Poundstone is an American author, columnist, and skeptic. He has written a number of books including the Big Secrets series and a biography of Carl Sagan.

== Early life and education ==
Poundstone attended MIT and studied physics.

== Personal life ==
An enthusiastic fan of the fiction author Harry Stephen Keeler, Poundstone maintains the Keeler homepage and contributed to the anthology A to Izzard: A Harry Stephen Keeler Companion (2002).

He is a cousin of comedian Paula Poundstone.

== Bibliography ==
- Big Secrets: The Uncensored Truth About All Sorts of Stuff You Are Never Supposed to Know. 1983.
- Poundstone, William (1984). The Recursive Universe: Cosmic Complexity and the Limits of Scientific Knowledge. Contemporary Books. ISBN 978-0809252022.
- Bigger Secrets: More Than 125 Things They Prayed You'd Never Find Out. 1986.
- Labyrinths of Reason: Paradox, Puzzles, and the Frailty of Knowledge. 1988.
- The Ultimate: The Great Armchair Debates Settled Once and for All. 1990.
- Poundstone, William (1992). Prisoner's Dilemma: John von Neumann, Game Theory, and the Puzzle of the Bomb. Knopf Doubleday Publishing. ISBN 978-0385415804.
- Biggest Secrets: More Uncensored Truth About All Sorts of Stuff You Are Never Supposed to Know. 1993.
- Carl Sagan: A Life in the Cosmos. 1999.
- The Big Book of Big Secrets. 2001. reprints Big Secrets and Biggest Secrets
- How Would You Move Mount Fuji? : Microsoft's Cult of the Puzzle – How the World's Smartest Companies Select the Most Creative Thinkers. 2003.
- Poundstone, William (2005). Fortune's Formula: The Untold Story of the Scientific Betting System That Beat the Casinos and Wall Street. Macmillan. ISBN 978-0809045990.
- Gaming the Vote: Why Elections Aren't Fair (and What We Can Do About It). Hill & Wang. 2008. ISBN 978-0809048922.
- Priceless: The Myth of Fair Value (and How to Take Advantage of It). 2010.
- Are You Smart Enough to Work at Google?. 2011.
- Poundstone, William (2014). Rock Breaks Scissors: A Practical Guide to Outguessing and Outwitting Almost Everybody. Little, Brown. ISBN 978-0316228060.
- Poundstone, William (2016). Head in the Cloud: Why Knowing Things Still Matters When Facts Are So Easy to Look Up. Little, Brown. ISBN 978-0316256544.
- Poundstone, William (2019). The Doomsday Calculation: How an Equation that Predicts the Future Is Transforming Everything We Know About Life and the Universe. Hachette Book Group USA. ISBN 978-0316423922. Released as How to Predict Everything in the UK Description & arrow/scrollable preview. Also summarized in Poundstone's essay, "Math Says Humanity May Have Just 760 Years Left," Wall Street Journal, updated June 27, 2019. Retrieved 22 September 2020.
- Poundstone, William (2021). How Do You Fight a Horse-Sized Duck?: Secrets to Succeeding at Interview Mind Games and Getting the Job You Want. New York: Little, Brown Spark. ISBN 978-0316494540.
