= John E. Exner =

American psychologist

John E. Exner, Jr. (April 18, 1928 – February 20, 2006), born in Syracuse, New York, was an American psychologist. He received a BS and an MS degree in psychology from Trinity University and a PhD in clinical psychology from Cornell University in 1958. From 1968 to 1969 he served as a director for the East Asia/Pacific and North Africa, Near East, South Asia Regions of the Office of Selection, Peace Corps of the United States of America. Later he became a faculty member at Long Island University, where he was director of clinical training from 1969 to 1979. He became professor emeritus in 1984.

Exner's name is famous because of his work on the Rorschach inkblot test. He was executive director of Rorschach Workshops in Asheville, North Carolina. For more than three decades he focused on the Rorschach and developed a standardized system for its interpretation. His Exner system of scoring, formally known as the Comprehensive System, was first published in 1974 and is now the standard method in psychology for administering, scoring and interpreting the Rorschach inkblot test. Through his work, the Rorschach inkblot test became a more useful psychometric instrument.

For his outstanding lifetime contribution, he received the Bruno Klopfer Award in 1980.

Exner died from leukemia in 2006.
