= Stoelting =

Stoelting Co.
- Formerly: Chicago Laboratory Supply and Scale Co.
- Industry: Psychological assessments, psychophysiological measurement
- Founded: 1886
- Founder: Christian Hans Stoelting
- Headquarters: Illinois, United States
- Products: Leiter-3, Merrill-Palmer-Revised, Stroop Color and Word Test, polygraphs

Stoelting is a company founded in 1886, based in Illinois, United States, in the field of psychological assessments, physiological assessment, and psychophysiological measurement.

== History ==
Stoelting was founded as the Chicago Laboratory Supply and Scale Co. by Christian Hans Stoelting in 1886.

From 1903 to 1943, Stoelting was the principal producer of psychological assessments and therapeutic products of the material culture of American psychology, with products that were supplied globally.

Stoelting continues to produce psychological assessments, including the Leiter-3, Merrill-Palmer-Revised, and Stroop, Color & Word Test, polygraphs, and equipment for experimental psychology.
