= Big Secrets =

Book series by William Poundstone

- Author: William Poundstone
- Publication date: 1983

Big Secrets is a series of books written by William Poundstone, and also the title of the first book in the series.

== History ==
In each book, Poundstone seeks to explore a number of mysteries, and reveal "the uncensored truth about all sorts of stuff you are never supposed to know" (the series' tagline and the first book's subtitle).

Some of the mysteries Poundstone explores are urban legends (such as what happened to Walt Disney after his death), while others are day-to-day matters which many people may not think to contemplate, such as what barcodes mean, the Coca-Cola formula, secret air frequencies, or what makes up KFC's 11 herbs and spices recipe.

Other mysteries explored in the series include Mount Weather, the number stations, backmasking on records, the secrets of Scientology, the true identities of The Residents, the initiation rites of the Freemasons and of college fraternities, anti-counterfeiting devices on money and documents, and the magic of David Copperfield.

The three Big Secrets books are:

- Big Secrets (1983; ISBN 0-688-04830-7)
- Bigger Secrets (1989; ISBN 0-395-53008-3)
- Biggest Secrets (1994; ISBN 0-688-13792-X)

Big Secrets and Biggest Secrets were later re-released in a joint volume called The Big Book of Big Secrets.
