= Management of scoliosis =

The management of scoliosis is complex and is determined primarily by the type of scoliosis encountered: syndromic, congenital, neuromuscular, or idiopathic. Treatment options for idiopathic scoliosis are determined in part by the severity of the curvature and skeletal maturity, which together help predict the likelihood of progression. Non-surgical treatment (conservative treatment) should be pro-active with intervention performed early as "Best results were obtained in 10-25 degrees scoliosis which is a good indication to start therapy before more structural changes within the spine establish." Treatment options have historically been categorized under the following types:

1. Observation
2. Bracing
3. Specialized physical therapy
4. Surgery

For adults, treatment usually focuses on relieving any pain, while physiotherapy and braces usually play only a minor role.

1. Painkilling medication
2. Bracing
3. Exercise
4. Surgery

Treatment for idiopathic scoliosis also depends upon the severity of the curvature, the spine's potential for further growth, and the risk that the curvature will progress.

Mild scoliosis (less than 30 degrees deviation) has traditionally been treated through observation only. However, the progression of adolescent idiopathic scoliosis has been linked to rapid growth, suggesting that observation alone is inadequate as progression can rapidly occur during the pubertal growth spurt. Another study has further shown that the peak rate of growth during puberty can actually be higher in individuals with scoliosis than those without, further exacerbating the issue of rapid worsening of the scoliosis curves. Moderately severe scoliosis (30–45 degrees) in a child who is still growing requires bracing. A 2013 study by Weinstein et al. found that rigid bracing significantly reduces worsening of curves in the 20-45 degree range and found that 58% of children receiving "observation only" progressed to surgical range. Recent guidelines published by the Scientific Society of Scoliosis Orthopaedic and Rehabilitation Treatment (SOSORT) in 2016 state that "the use of a brace is recommended in patients with evolutive idiopathic scoliosis above 25º during growth" based on a review of current scientific literature. Severe curvatures that rapidly progress may be treated surgically with spinal rod placement. Thus, early detection and early intervention prior to the pubertal growth spurt provides the greatest correction and prevention of progression to surgical range. In all cases, early intervention offers the best results. A growing body of scientific research testifies to the efficacy of specialized treatment programs of physical therapy, which may include bracing.

== Physical therapy ==
Physical therapists and occupational therapists help those who have experienced an injury or illness regain or maintain the ability to participate in everyday activities. For those with scoliosis, a physical therapist and/or occupational therapist can provide assistance through assessment, intervention, and ongoing evaluation of the condition. This helps them manage physical symptoms and/or use compensatory techniques so that they can participate in daily activities like self-care, productivity, and leisure.

One intervention involves bracing. During the past several decades, a large variety of bracing devices have been developed for the treatment of scoliosis. Studies demonstrate that preventing force sideways across a joint by bracing prevents further curvature of the spine in idiopathic scoliosis, while other studies have also shown that braces can be used by individuals with scoliosis during physical activities. Scoliosis is not merely a lateral or sideways deformity, but occurs in three dimensions as a rotational component is often present.

Other interventions include postural strategies, such as posture training in sitting, standing, and sleeping positions, and in using positioning supports such as pillows, wedges, rolls, and corsets.

Adaptive and compensatory strategies are also employed to help facilitate individuals to returning daily activities.

=== Scoliosis Specific Exercises ===
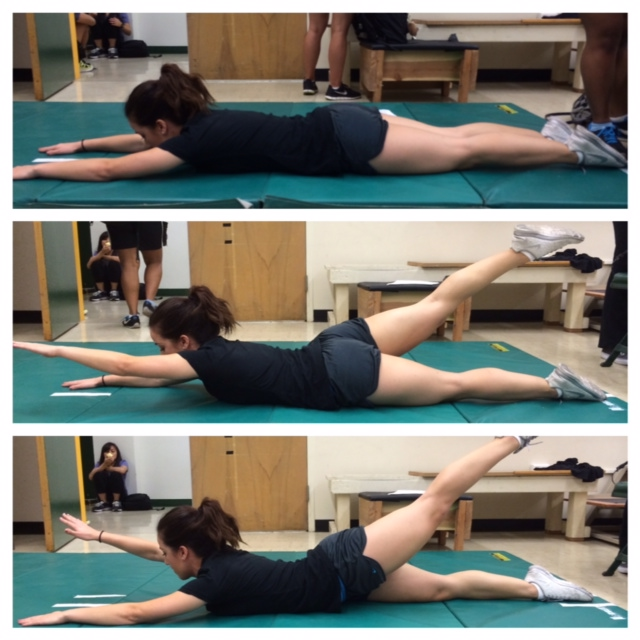
A spinal muscle exercise performed by lying in the prone position and performing alternating shoulder flexions and hip extensions

Scoliosis specific exercises have been found to improve treatment outcomes when utilized in addition to bracing and other standards of care. Scoliosis specific exercises include methods such as Schroth which specifically aim to correct aesthetic differences and strengthened muscles and connective tissue that may have atrophied as a result of scoliosis and asymmetric posture. The Schroth method is a three-dimensional exercise approach aiming to improve spinal curvature and vertebral rotational angles. A physical therapist guides the patient through breathing techniques and exercises to strengthen weak muscles and relieve overactive ones. In addition to spinal realignment, the Schroth method improves self-image, quality of life, and lumbar extensor strength. Schroth exercises and other scoliosis specific exercises should be utilized in conjunction with bracing and other standards of care, and be performed under the guidance of a trained professional to ensure the exercises are effective and target the individual's curve pattern so that the correct muscles are strengthened. Strengthening spinal muscles is a crucial preventive measure. This is because the muscles in the back are essential when it comes to supporting the spinal column and maintaining the spine's proper shape. Exercises that will help improve the strength of the muscles in the back include rows and leg and arm extensions. Elastic resistance exercise may also be able to sustain the progression of spinal curvature. This type of exercise is able to sustain progression by equalizing the strength of the torso muscles found on each side of the body.

=== Self-care ===
Disability caused by scoliosis, as well as physical limitations during recovery from treatment-related surgery, often affects an individual's ability to perform self-care activities. One of the first treatments of scoliosis is the attempt to prevent further curvature of the spine. Depending on the size of the curvature, this is typically done in one of three ways: bracing, surgery, or postural positioning through customized cushioning. Stopping the progression of the scoliosis can prevent the loss of function in many activities of daily living by maintaining range of motion, preventing deformity of the rib cage, and reducing pain during activities such as bending or lifting.

Occupational therapists are often involved in the process of selection and fabrication of customized cushions. These individualized postural supports are used to maintain the current spinal curvature, or they can be adjusted to assist in the correction of the curvature. This type of treatment can help to maintain mobility for a wheelchair user by preventing the deformity of the rib cage and maintaining an active range of motion in the arms.

For other self-care activities (such as dressing, bathing, grooming, personal hygiene, and feeding), several strategies can be used as a part of occupational therapy treatment. Environmental adaptations for bathing could include a bath bench, grab bars installed in the shower area, or a handheld shower nozzle. For activities such as dressing and grooming, various assistive devices and strategies can be used to promote independence. An occupational therapist may recommend a long-handled reacher that can be used to assist self-dressing by allowing a person to avoid painful movements such as bending over; a long-handled shoehorn can be used for putting on and removing shoes. Problems with activities such as cutting meat and eating can be addressed by using specialized cutlery, kitchen utensils, or dishes.

=== Productivity ===
Productive activities include paid or unpaid work, household chores, school, and play. Recent studies in healthcare have led to the development of a variety of treatments to assist in the management of scoliosis thereby maximizing productivity for people of all ages. Assistive technology has undergone dramatic changes over the past 20 years; the availability and quality of the technology has improved greatly. As a result of using assistive technology, functional changes may range from improvements in abilities, performance in daily activities, participation levels, and quality of life.

A common assistive technology intervention is specialized seating and postural control. For children with poor postural control, a comfortable seating system that provides them with the support needed to maintain a sitting position can be essential for raising their overall level of well-being. A child's well-being in a productive sense involves the ability to participate in classroom and play activities. Specialized wheelchair seating has been identified as the most common prescription in the management of scoliosis in teenagers with muscular dystrophy.

With comfortable wheelchair seating, teenagers are able to participate in classroom activities for longer periods with less fatigue. By tilting the seating position 20° forward (toward the thighs), seating pressure is significantly redistributed, so sitting is more comfortable. If an office worker with scoliosis can sit for longer periods, increased work output is likely to occur and could improve quality of life. Tall, forward-sloping seats or front parts of seats, and when possible with tall desk with the opposite slope, can, in general, reduce pains and the need of bending significantly while working or studying, and that is particularly important with braced, fragile, or tender backs. An open hip angle can benefit the used lung volume and respiration.

For those not using a wheelchair, bracing may be used to treat scoliosis. Lifestyle changes are made to compensate for the proper use of spine braces.

=== Leisure ===
Physical symptoms such as chest pains, back pains, shortness of breath, and limited spinal movement can hamper or preclude participation in leisure activities of a physical nature. The occupational therapist's role is to facilitate participation by helping the patient manage these symptoms.

Bracing is a common strategy recommended by an occupational therapist, in particular, for individuals engaging in sports and exercise. An OT is responsible for educating an individual on the advantages and disadvantages of different braces, proper ways to wear the brace, and the day-to-day care of the brace.

To help a person manage heart and lung symptoms, such as shortness of breath or chest pains, an occupational therapist can teach the individual energy conservation techniques. This includes scheduling routine breaks during the activity, as suitable for the individual. For example, an occupational therapist can recommend that a swimmer take breaks between laps to conserve energy. Adapting or modifying the exercise or sport is another way a person with scoliosis can do it. Adapting the activity may change the difficulty of the sport or exercise. For example, it might mean taking breaks throughout an exercise. If a person with scoliosis is unable to participate in a sport or exercise, an OT can help the individual explore other physical activities that are suitable to his/her interests and capabilities. An occupational therapist and the person with scoliosis can explore enjoyable and meaningful participation in the sport/exercise in another capacity, such as coaching or refereeing.

== Bracing ==
Bracing is most effective when the patient has bone growth remaining (is skeletally immature) and should aim to both prevent progression of the curve (prevent progression to surgery), as well as reduce the scoliosis curve. Reduction of the curve is important as the natural history of idiopathic scoliosis suggests it can continue to progress at a rate ~1 degree per year in adulthood, while the treatment results of bracing have been shown to hold over >15 years. In some cases with juveniles, bracing has reduced curves significantly, going from a 40 degrees (of the curve, mentioned in length above.) out of the brace to 18 degrees in it. Braces are sometimes prescribed for adults to relieve pain related to scoliosis. Bracing involves fitting the patient with a device that covers the torso; in some cases, it extends to the neck. The most commonly used brace is a TLSO, such as a Cheneau type brace, a corset-like appliance that fits from armpits to hips and is custom-made from fiberglass or plastic. It is worn upwards of 18–23 hours a day, depending on the doctor's prescription, and applies pressure on the curves in the spine. The effectiveness of the brace depends not only on brace design and orthotist skill; patient compliance; and amount of wear per day, but also the "stiffness" of the spine resulting from a shortened spinal cord and/or nerve tension. as evidence by the force necessary (mean force ~121 lbs) to physically correct scoliosis during spinal surgery The typical use of braces for idiopathic scoliosis is to prevent progression to surgical range as well as reduce the scoliotic curve of the spine as spinal fusion surgery can reduce mobility due to fusion of the vertebrate while potentially increasing pain long term. For non-idiopathic scoliosis (ie. neuromuscular, congenital, etc.) and those with additional comorbidities (ie. Marfans Syndrome) spinal surgery may be required due to structural changes in the spine.

Indications for Scoliosis Bracing: Scoliosis professionals determine the proper bracing method for a patient after a complete clinical evaluation. The patient's growth potential, age, maturity, and scoliosis (Cobb angle, rotation, and sagittal profile) are also considered. Immature patients who present with Cobb angles less than 20 degrees should be closely monitored and proactively treated based on their risk of progression as surgery can be prevented with early intervention of conservative treatment. Immature patients who present with Cobb angles of 20 degrees to 29 degrees should be braced according to the risk of progression by considering age, Cobb angle increase over a six-month period, Risser sign, and clinical presentation. Immature patients who present with Cobb angles greater than 30 degrees should be braced. However, these are guidelines and not every patient will fit into this table. For example, an immature patient with a 17-degree Cobb angle and significant thoracic rotation or flatback could be considered for nighttime bracing. On the opposite end of the growth spectrum, a 29-degree Cobb angle and a Risser sign three or four might not need to be braced because there is reduced potential for progression.

Surgery is indicated by the Society on Scoliosis Orthopaedic and Rehabilitation Treatment (SOSORT) at 45 degrees to 50 degrees and by the Scoliosis Research Society (SRS) at a Cobb angle of 45 degrees. SOSORT uses the 45-degree to 50-degree threshold as a result of the well-documented, plus or minus five degrees measurement error that can occur while measuring Cobb angles.

Scoliosis braces are usually comfortable for the patient, especially when it is well designed and fit; also after the 7- to 10-day break-in period. A well fit and functioning scoliosis brace provides comfort when it is supporting the deformity and redirecting the body into a more corrected and normal physiological position.

The Scoliosis Research Society's recommendations for bracing include curves progressing to larger than 25°, curves presenting between 30 and 45°, Risser sign 0, 1, or 2 (an X-ray measurement of a pelvic growth area), and less than six months from the onset of menses in girls.

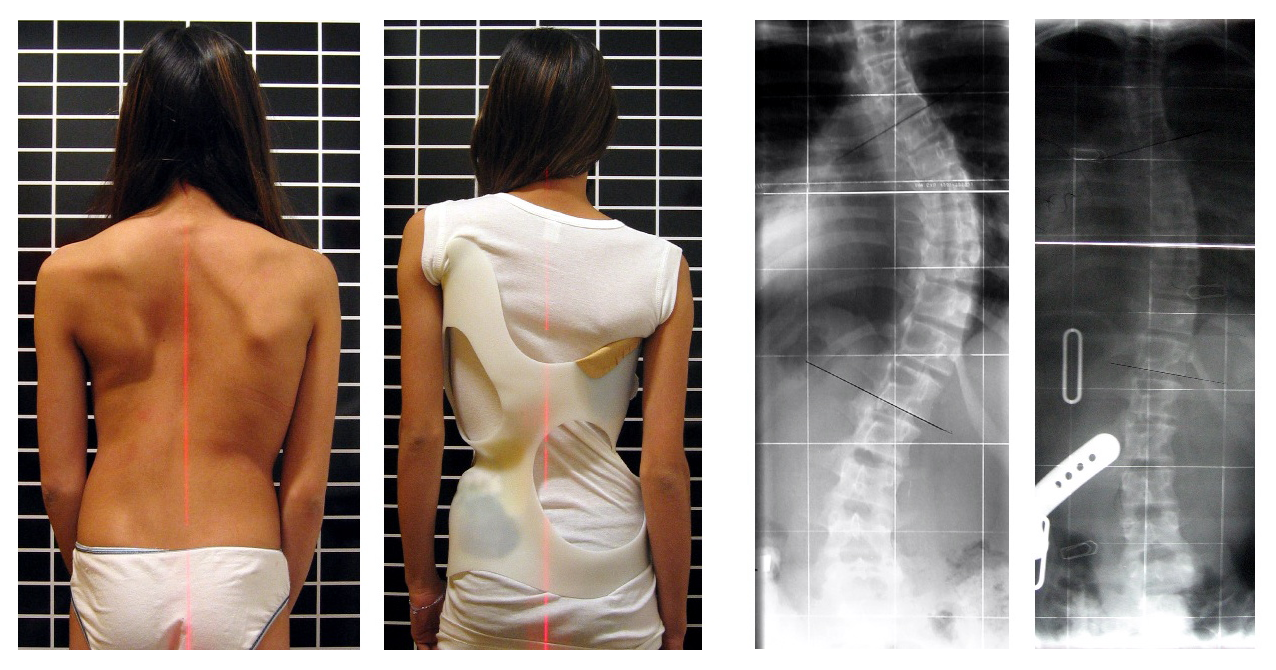
A Chêneau brace achieving correction from 56° to 27° Cobb angle

Progressive scolioses exceeding 25° Cobb angle in the pubertal growth spurt should be treated with a pattern-specific brace like the Chêneau brace and its derivatives, with an average brace-wearing time of 16 hours/day (23 hours/day assures the best possible result).

The latest standard of brace construction is with CAD/CAM technology. With the help of this technology, it has been possible to standardize the pattern-specific brace treatment. Severe mistakes in brace construction are largely ruled out with the help of these systems. This technology also eliminates the need to make a plaster cast for brace construction. The measurements can be taken in any place and are simple (and not comparable to plastering). Available CAD/CAM braces include the Regnier-Chêneau brace, the Rigo-System-Chêneau-brace (RSC brace), the Silicon Valley Brace, and the Gensingen brace; braces can and should be customized to fit the individual's curve pattern and reduce the curve as much as possible as immediate in-brace correction has been shown to be associated with better treatment outcomes. Many patients prefer the "Chêneau light" brace as it has good in-brace corrections reported in international literature and is easier to wear than other braces in use today. However, this brace is not available for all curve patterns.

Prior to 2013 the efficacy of bracing has not been definitively demonstrated in randomised clinical studies, with more limited studies giving inconsistent conclusions. In 2013 the Bracing in Adolescent Idiopathic Scoliosis Trial (BrAIST) published results establishing benefits of bracing in adolescents with idiopathic scoliosis. In the randomized cohort, 72% in the group instructed to wear a brace for 18 hours per day against 48% in the observation group sustained curve progression to under 50 degrees, the proxy used for not requiring surgery. Additionally results suggested that the more a patient wore the brace, the better the result.

=== Casting ===
In progressive infantile and sometimes juvenile scoliosis, a plaster jacket applied early may be used instead of a brace. It has been proven possible to permanently correct cases of infantile idiopathic scoliosis by applying a series of plaster casts (EDF: elongation, derotation, flexion) on a specialized frame under corrective traction, which helps to "mould" the infant's soft bones and work with their growth spurts. This method was pioneered by UK scoliosis specialist Min Mehta. EDF casting is now the only clinically known nonsurgical method of complete correction in progressive infantile scoliosis. Complete correction may be obtained for curves less than 50° if the treatment begins before the second year of life.

== Surgery ==
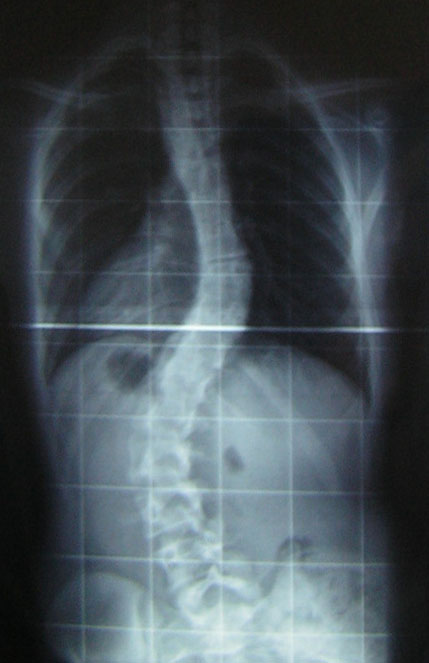
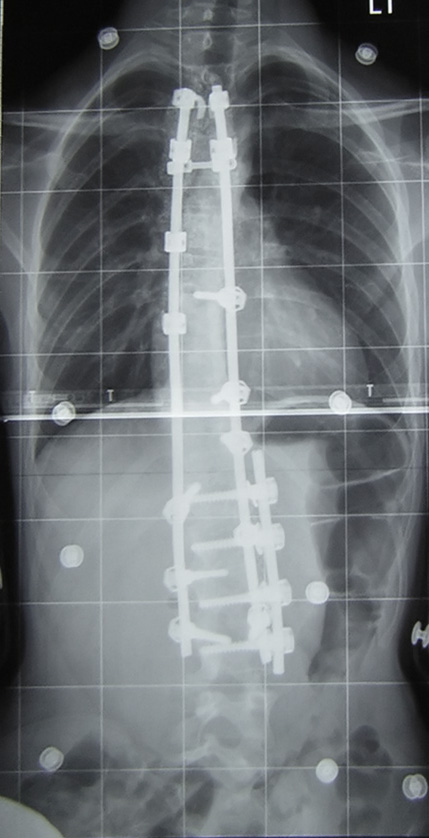
Preoperative (left) and postoperative (right) X-ray of a person with thoracic dextroscoliosis and lumbar levoscoliosis: The X-ray is usually projected such that the right side of the subject is on the right side of the image; i.e., the subject is viewed from the rear (see left image; the right image is seen from the front). This projection is typically used by spine surgeons, as it is how surgeons see their patients when they are on the operating table (in the prone position). This is the opposite of conventional chest X-ray, where the image is projected as if looking at the patient from the front. The surgery was a fusion with instrumentation.

Surgery is usually recommended by orthopedists for curves with a high likelihood of progression (i.e., greater than 45 to 50° of magnitude), curves that would be cosmetically unacceptable as an adult, curves in patients with spina bifida and cerebral palsy that interfere with sitting and care, and curves that affect physiological functions such as breathing.

Surgery for scoliosis is performed by a surgeon specializing in spine surgery. For various reasons, it is usually impossible to completely straighten a scoliotic spine, but in most cases, significant corrections are achieved.

The two main types of surgery are:

- Anterior fusion: This surgical approach is through an incision at the side of the chest wall.
- Posterior fusion: This surgical approach is through an incision on the back and involves the use of metal instrumentation to correct the curve.

One or both of these surgical procedures may be needed. The surgery may be done in one or two stages and, on average, takes four to eight hours. A Cochrane review could not draw conclusions on how effective surgical interventions were when compared to non-surgical interventions in patients with adolescent idiopathic scoliosis.

=== Spinal fusion with instrumentation ===
Spinal fusion is the most widely performed surgery for scoliosis. In this procedure, bone [either harvested from elsewhere in the body (autograft) or from a donor (allograft)] is grafted to the vertebrae so when they heal, they form one solid bone mass and the vertebral column becomes rigid. This prevents worsening of the curve, at the expense of some spinal movement. This can be performed from the anterior (front) aspect of the spine by entering the thoracic or abdominal cavities, or more commonly, performed from the back (posterior). A combination may be used in more severe cases, though the modern pedicle screw system has largely negated the need for this.

In recent years all-screw systems have become the gold-standard technique for adolescent idiopathic scoliosis. Pedicle screws achieve better fixation of the vertebral column and have better biomechanical properties than previous techniques, so enabling greater correction of the curve in all planes.

Pedicle screw-only posterior spinal fusion may improve major curve correction at two years among patients with adolescent idiopathic scoliosis (AIS) as compared to hybrid instrumentation (proximal hooks with distal pedicle screws) (65% versus 46%) according to a retrospective, matched-cohort study. The prospective cohorts were matched to the retrospective cohorts according to patient age, fusion levels, Lenke curve type, and operative method. The two groups were not significantly different in regard to age, Lenke AIS curve type, or Riser grade. The numbers of fused vertebrae were significantly different (11.7±1.6 for pedicle screw versus 13.0±1.2 for hybrid group). This study's results may be biased due to the pedicle screw group's being analyzed prospectively versus retrospective analysis of the hybrid instrumentation group.

In general, modern spinal fusions have good outcomes with high degrees of correction and low rates of failure and infection. However a systematic review of PubMed papers in 2008 concluded "Scoliosis surgery has a varying but high rate of complications", although the non-standardised data on complications was difficult to assess and was incomplete. Patients with fused spines and permanent implants tend to have normal lives with unrestricted activities when they are younger; it remains to be seen whether those that have been treated with the newer surgical techniques develop problems as they age.

=== Thoracoplasty ===
A complementary surgical procedure a surgeon may recommend is called thoracoplasty (also called costoplasty). This is a procedure to reduce the rib hump that affects most scoliosis patients with a thoracic curve. A rib hump is evidence of some rotational deformity to the spine. Thoracoplasty may also be performed to obtain bone grafts from the ribs instead of the pelvis, regardless of whether a rib hump is present. Thoracoplasty can be performed as part of a spinal fusion or as a separate surgery, entirely.

Thoracoplasty is the removal (or resection) of typically four to six segments of adjacent ribs that protrude. Each segment is one to two inches long. The surgeon decides which ribs to resect based on either their prominence or their likelihood to be realigned by correction of the curvature alone. The ribs grow back straight.

Thoracoplasty has risks, such as increased pain in the rib area during recovery or reduced pulmonary function (10–15% is typical) following surgery. This impairment can last anywhere from a few months to two years. Because thoracoplasty may lengthen the duration of surgery, patients may also lose more blood or develop complications from the prolonged anesthesia. A more significant, though far less common, risk is the surgeon might inadvertently puncture the pleura, a protective coating over the lungs. This could cause blood or air to drain into the chest cavity, hemothorax or pneumothorax, respectively.

=== Surgery without fusion for growing children ===
Implants that aim to delay spinal fusion and to allow more spinal growth in young children is the gold standard for surgical treatment of early onset scoliosis. Surgery without fusion can be divided into three principles: distraction of the entire spine, compression of the short segment of spine, and guided-growth techniques. Distraction-based systems include Vertical, Expandable Prosthetic Titanium Ribs (VEPTR) & growing rods. The concept uses distraction to create additional soft-tissue space in-between the vertebrae, for the bone to later grow into. Its universal application was thrusted through the use of traditional growth rods which required repeated invasive surgeries every 6–12 months for the sustenance of growth, via distraction. Nowadays developed countries only use MAGEC (MAGnetic Expansion Control) rods to non-invasively lengthen the spine. In contrast, developing and under-developed countries still use traditional growing rods, which require invasive surgery every 6–12 months, because of high initial cost associated with procurement of MAGEC rods. Compression-based system include tethering using a flexible rope-like implant and are relatively new to receive FDA approval. Guided-growth technique include SHILLA (named after a hotel in Korea, where the concept was initiated). SHILLA has the advantage of being one-time surgery and is technologically less demanding compared with MAGEC rod. However, there are still two major disadvantages of using SHILLA: loss of correction and need for osteotomies.

The failure of most of these standalone techniques has shown that the concept of "one size fits all" is not applicable for the surgical management of EOS. Therefore, newer concepts employing two or more of the above philosophies, i.e. various combinations of distraction-based, guided-growth, and compression-based approaches might be more suitable and biomechanically-speaking, a more optimal surgical intervention. One such combination currently used for surgery includes active apex correction (APC). It is a hybrid of guided-growth and compression-based management of deformity. The technique simply consists of replacing the apical fusion (of traditional SHILLA) with unilateral compression (via pedicle screws or any other means) on the convex side. The latest clinical results presented by spine researchers Aakash Agarwal and Alaaedldin Azmi Ahmad on APC shows good clinical results with no economic barrier to use the technology.

=== Complications ===
The risk of undergoing surgery for scoliosis was estimated in 2008 to be varying, but with a high rate of complications. Possible complications may be inflammation of the soft tissue or deep inflammatory processes, breathing impairments, bleeding and nerve injuries. It is not yet clear what to expect from spine surgery in the long term.

Surgical spinal fusion outcomes have improved over time. 1911-era surgical attempts by Russell Hibbs had long immobilization times, high infection rates and lacked true spinal correction; they were deemed functionally and cosmetically unsatisfying. 1941-era American Orthopedic Association summaries indicated 70% of patients having only fair or poor outcomes with unstable results. Initial 65% curvature corrections had reduced to only 27% corrective after >2 years and torso deformity was unchanged or worse. 2006-era outcomes indicated initial adolescent curvature improvement levels can be maintained for decades, though the results of one or more spinal fusions still did not eliminate curvature. Pulmonary function and pain levels had little or no correlated improvements.

For spinal fusion surgery on AIS cases, with instrumentation attached using pedicle screws, complication rates were reported in 2011 as transient neurological injuries between 0% to 1.5%, a pedicle fracture rate of 0.24%, screw malposition assessed by radiography at 1.5%, 6% when assessed by CT scans though these patients were asymptomatic not requiring screw revision, and screw loosening noted in 0.76% of patients.

The cosmetic effects of surgery are not necessarily stable. For surgery without fusion in growing children, a substantial percentage of patients undergoing SHILLA technique experience loss of correction via crankshafting or adding-on (e.g., distal migration). In addition, the need for osteotomies on the concave side has the potential of severe complications. For MAGEC rods, higher distraction magnitude resulted in the generation of higher distraction forces, and this in combination with off-axis loading (exemplified by "growth marks") result in wear and breakage of MAGEC rod's components.

The Scoliosis Research Society summarized its annual, voluntarily reported, case counts ranging between 40,464–49,615 worldwide (anno 2013–2020) as having an overall complication rate of 2.86%. Mortality rates ranged between 0.09%–0.14%. Infection rates varied from 0.95 to 1.30% annually with noticeable disparity between spinal deformity groups, neuromuscular scoliosis having the highest infection rates (3.24–3.94%). The rates of new neurological deficits (e.g., nerve root, cauda equine and spinal cord) ranged from 0.74 to 0.94%, with congenital kyphosis (2.32–4.03%) and congenital dysplastic spondylolisthesis (2.53–4.76%) being the most pronounced. Rates of an unintended post-operative surgery ranged from 1.60 to 1.79% with an average secondary surgery time of ~2 years.

=== After-surgery care ===
==== Pain medication ====
In the event of surgery to correct scoliosis, pain medications and anesthesia will be administered. Before the surgery, the patient will receive anesthesia. With adults, the anesthesia will be administered through an IV in the antecubital region of the arm. With young children, however, the child will be asked to breathe in nitrous oxide, or laughing gas. Because needles can be frightening for a young child, the nitrous oxide will put them to sleep so the anesthesiologist can then insert the IV in order to give them the anesthesia. After the surgery, the patient will most likely be given morphine. Until the patient is ready to take the medicine by mouth, an IV will be giving them their medication. Morphine is the most common pain medicine used after scoliosis surgery, and is often administered through a patient-controlled analgesia (PCA) system. The PCA system allows the patient to push a button when they are feeling pain, and the PCA will emit the drugs into the IV and then into the body. To prevent overdoses, there is a limit on the number of times a patient can push the button. If a patient pushes the button too much at once, the PCA will reject the request.

==== Bowel and bladder function ====
For the patient's bladder control, a catheter will be inserted so that a patient can urinate without having to move. A catheter is inserted because the patient will not have much free movement to be able to get up and walk to the bathroom. The most common type of catheter used after major surgeries is an indwelling Foley catheter. The indwelling Foley catheter is most often put in the urethra, with a tube leading into a drainage bag. Once the catheter is inserted into the urethra, a balloon is blown up inside the bladder in order to keep it from falling out. The balloon allows the catheter to remain inside the urethra until the patient is able to get up and go to the bathroom on their own. The drainage bag is connected to the side of the bed, and must be changed or emptied out once it is full.

Bowel control can vary from patient to patient. The combination of no food, very little fluids, and a lot of prescription drugs has the potential to cause many patients to become constipated. The body is used to a normal diet, and used to excreting waste in a system. Interrupting the system can cause bowel problems. This constipation can be resolved in a couple of ways. The first way, and the most common way, is to administer a rectal suppository. A rectal suppository is administered through the anus, and into the rectum. They are bullet-shaped and contain medicine that will help the patient's bowels get back on track. Once the suppository is inserted, it is designed to melt off the wax-like case, and put the medicine in the body. If the suppository does not work, a laxative may be continued at home to keep the bowels in full function.

==== Diet ====
When first returning home after surgery, a nutritional diet is necessary in order to keep the body operating correctly. Junk food is not a good idea, as the grease and sugar can irregulate the bowels. Fruit, vegetables, and juices will be a vital part in the diet. Food and drink will be limited for the patient after surgery. Because the bowels are not fully active because of anesthetic, clear water and ice may be the only acceptable thing to ingest. After the digestive tract is back up to speed, soft food and drink like pudding, soup broth, and orange juice are acceptable. Very dark urine with a strong odor means that the person is most likely dehydrated and needs more fluids. In order for the urine to become a pale or clear color, the patient will need to drink a lot of water. Juices such as prune juice are a healthy option and prune juice also helps with constipation, a common factor after surgery. When it comes to food, whole grains should be added into the diet. Whole grains can be broken down easily by the body whereas processed grains and flour cannot be broken down easily. Processed grains and flour also add to constipation.

== History ==
In 1962, Paul Harrington introduced a metal spinal system of instrumentation that assisted with straightening the spine, as well as holding it rigid while fusion took place. The original (now obsolete) Harrington rod operated on a ratchet system, attached by hooks to the spine at the top and bottom of the curvature that when cranked would distract, or straighten, the curve. The Harrington rod represented a major advance in the field, as it obviated the need for prolonged casting, allowing patients greater mobility in the postoperative period and significantly reducing the quality of life burden of fusion surgery. Additionally, as the first system to apply instrumentation directly to the spine, the Harrington rod was the precursor to most modern spinal instrumentation systems. A major shortcoming of the Harrington method was it failed to produce a posture wherein the skull would be in proper alignment with the pelvis, and it did not address rotational deformity. As a result, unfused parts of the spine would try to compensate for this in the effort to stand up straight. As the person aged, there would be increased wear and tear, early-onset arthritis, disc degeneration, muscular stiffness, and pain with eventual reliance on painkillers, further surgery, inability to work full-time, and disability. "Flatback" became the medical name for a related complication, especially for those who had lumbar scoliosis.

In the 1960s, the gold standard for idiopathic scoliosis was a posterior approach using a single Harrington rod. Post-operative recovery involved bed rest, casts, and braces. Poor results became apparent over time.

In the 1970s, an improved technique was developed using two rods and wires attached at each level of the spine. This segmented instrumentation system allowed patients to become mobile soon after surgery.

In the 1980s, Cotrel-Dubousset instrumentation improved fixation and addressed sagittal imbalance and rotational defects unresolved by the Harrington rod system. This technique used multiple hooks with rods to give stronger fixation in three dimensions, usually eliminating the need for post-operative bracing.
