= Khaled J. Saleh =

Dr. Khaled J. Saleh
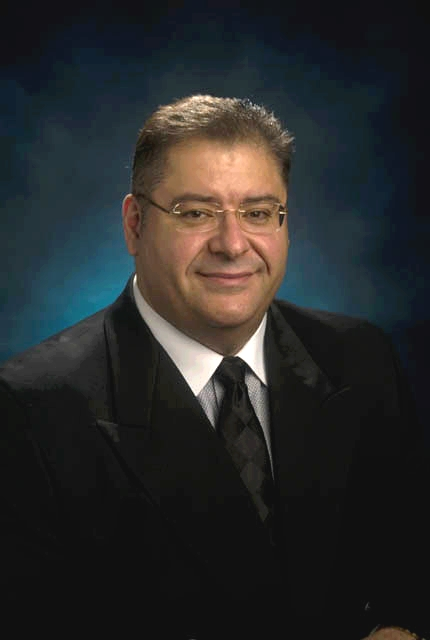
- 2013

Khaled J. Saleh is an Egyptian-American board-certified orthopaedic surgeon specializing in the diagnosis and treatment of orthopaedic conditions, and is known for surgery relating to adult reconstruction and joint replacement. Saleh's work has been supported by nearly $7 million in grant funding, resulting in over 400 scientific publications.

== Biography ==
Saleh was born on September 24, 1964, in Kuwait to Fathiya and Jamal Saleh. The Egyptian derivation of his surname comes from his paternal ancestor, who emigrated from Alexandria, Egypt to Yaffa, Palestine in the 1930s. The family eventually settled in Kuwait after being evacuated in 1948 from their town Salameh during the 1948 Arab–Israeli War. In 1966 Saleh emigrated with a number of family members to Canada, where the family eventually settled in Belleville, Ontario where Saleh completed his middle and high school education. Saleh went on to attend the University of Western Ontario on an academic scholarship. During that time he met his wife Lena, whom he married in 1984. The couple resides in Michigan and has three children.

== Career, education and training ==
After completing his medical training at the University of Western Ontario, Saleh completed his postgraduate training in orthopaedic surgery at University of Toronto followed by a fellowship in geriatric orthopaedics at University of Toronto, followed by fellowship training in lower extremity training in lower-extremity reconstruction at Mount Sinai Hospital in Toronto and adult reconstruction at the Hospital for Special Surgery in New York. In 1998, he became a clinical instructor at Weill Cornell Medical College Hospital for Special Surgery and went on to join the faculty in the Department of Orthopaedic Surgery at the University of Minnesota. In 2004, Saleh became the Division Chief of Adult Reconstruction in the Department of Orthopaedic Surgery at the University of Virginia, where he also served as fellowship director.

He later served as a Chair of Orthopedics Surgery at Southern Illinois University School of Medicine, before joining the Detroit Medical Center as Executive in Chief of Orthopaedics and Sports Medicine. Saleh completed a master's degree in Health Care Management at the Harvard School of Public Health Executive Program.

== Professional activities, memberships and distinctions ==
Saleh is board certified in orthopaedic surgery by the American Board of Orthopaedic Surgery and sits on committees in academic orthopaedic societies such as the American Academy of Orthopaedic Surgeons and the American Orthopaedic Association. In addition, Saleh is a member of the American Association of Hip and Knee Surgeons, Association of Bone and Joint Surgeons, Canadian Medical Association, Canadian Orthopaedic Association, International Society of Arthroscopy, Knee Surgery, and Orthopaedic Sports Medicine, and the American College of Surgeons.

In addition to publishing over 400 peer-reviewed abstracts and manuscripts, he travels the national and international academic circuit to lecture on various topics relating to adult reconstruction. In 2005, Saleh released the Lower-Extremity Activity Scale (LEAS) in order to quantitatively measure changes in daily physical activity that occur before and after lower-limb arthroplasty. Quantitatively measuring patients' daily activity before and after surgery with Saleh's LEAS not only allows orthopaedic surgeons to more accurately manage and treat orthopaedic conditions, but also allows a more accurate analysis and prediction of surgical outcomes.

In addition to improving orthopaedic patient care through research, working with orthopaedic colleagues, Saleh developed the VEGA knee which was debuted by Aesculap (a B. Braun Melsungen company) in 2012. In addition to its posterior-stabilized kinematics, the VEGA knee features a 7-layer AS coating to minimize wear and low-profile box to preserve more of the patient's native bone. The VEGA's range of implant sizes allow customized fitting, and its dual-purpose instruments and simple design decrease surgery time, thereby lowering the risk of infection.
