= Melvin Starkey Henderson =

American orthopaedic surgeon

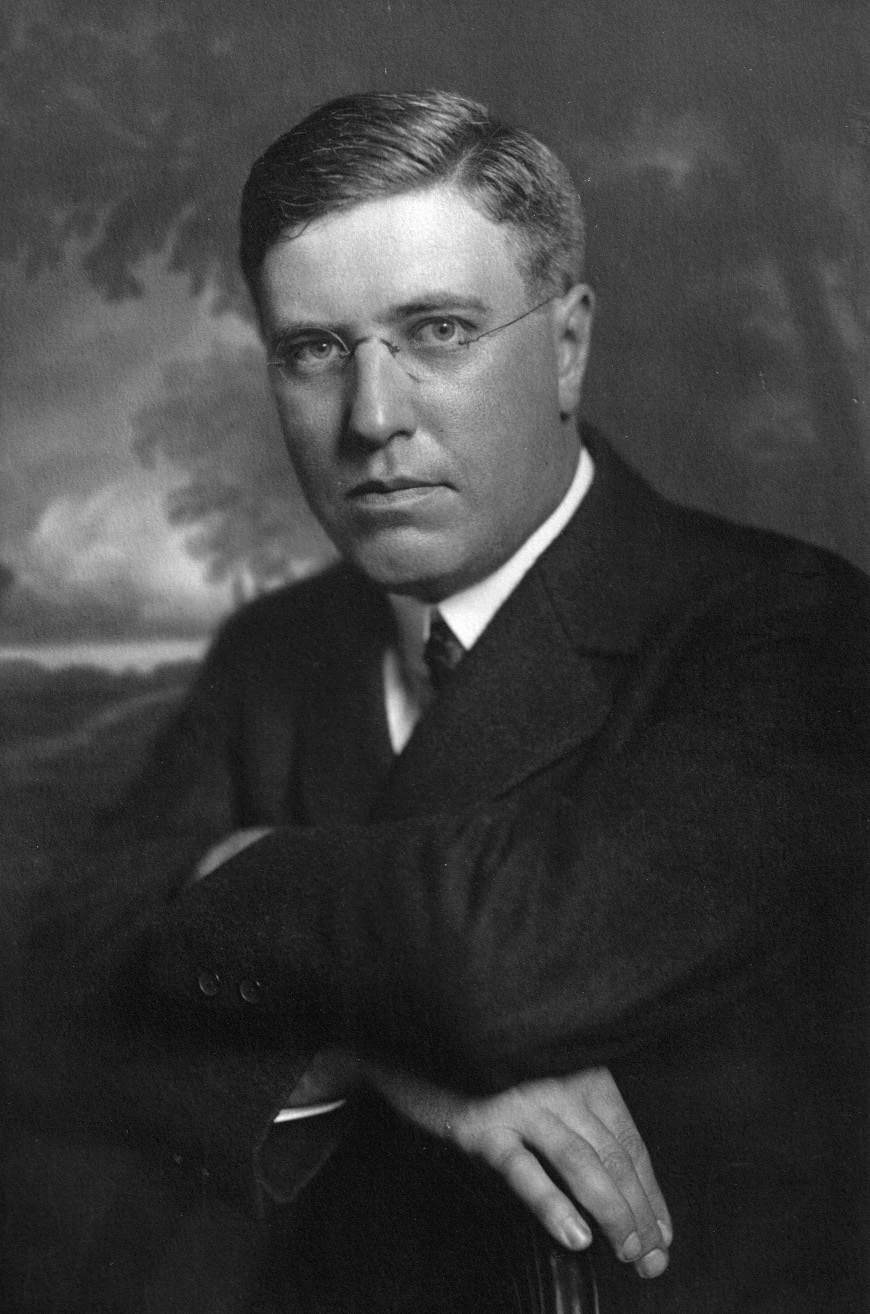
- Born: February 18, 1883; Saint Paul, Minnesota, U.S.
- Died: June 17, 1954 (aged 71); Rochester, Minnesota, U.S.
- Education: University of Toronto, M.B. 1906, M.D. 1914
- Occupation: Orthopaedic surgeon
- Employer: Mayo Clinic
- Known for: Founded the orthopaedic surgery unit at the Mayo Clinic; developed orthopaedic surgical techniques
- Spouse: Mabel Lillian Christensen
- Children: 2, including Edward Drewry Henderson
- Parent(s): Melvin Brooks Henderson and Emilie Grace Starkey

Melvin Starkey Henderson (1883–1954) was an American orthopaedic surgeon associated with the Mayo Clinic. He founded and led the clinic's orthopaedic surgery section and was the founding president of the American Board of Orthopaedic Surgery. He published early work on joint disorders, including synovial chondromatosis, and he developed new surgical techniques.

== Childhood ==
Henderson was born on February 18, 1883, in Saint Paul, Minnesota, to Melvin Brooks Henderson (1860–1939) and his first wife, Emilie Grace Starkey (1860–1894).

Upon his mother's death, Henderson went to Winnipeg, Manitoba, to live with the family of his maternal aunt, Eliza Starkey, and Edward Drewry, owner of the Drewry Brewery. He was raised with the Drewry children at the Drewry family home “Redwood”, and summered with his father at the Saint Paul farm.

== Career ==
He received his bachelor of medicine degree (1906) and doctor of medicine degree (1914) from the University of Toronto. From 1906 to 1907, he interned at the City and County Hospital in Saint Paul, and in 1907 he went to work in Rochester, Minnesota as an assistant to the Mayo brothers practice, William James and Charles Horace Mayo. He worked closely with Will Mayo as his surgical assistant from 1909 to 1911.

In 1910, Henderson proposed the creation of separate section for orthopaedic surgery. The Mayos approved this suggestion, setting Henderson on his path as a specialist in bone surgery. During 1911, they sent him to the UK, to work under Sir Robert Jones in Liverpool, England, and then Sir Harold Stiles in Edinburgh, Scotland, both recognized as experts in the new field of specialized orthopaedic surgery.

Upon his return to Rochester, he organized the new section of orthopaedic surgery at the Mayo Clinic, which he headed until his retirement in 1948. He was active in graduate training at the Mayo Clinic through the University of Minnesota and held appointments as associate professor of orthopaedic surgery from 1915 to 1920 and as professor from 1920 to 1951.

Henderson was noted for his work on bone-grafting and for fractures of the neck of the femur. He developed a well-recognized procedure for treating recurrent shoulder dislocations, and he wrote a number of papers on internal derangements of the knee joint. He pioneered the use of a guide pin for inserting “blind” hip nails. He is also recognized for his research on synovial chondromatosis, a disease affecting the thin flexible membrane around a joint called the synovium. The disorder is also known as Henderson–Jones syndrome, Reichel's syndrome, and Reichel–Jones–Henderson syndrome.

Henderson was involved in many national and international organizations, and was a founder and first president of the American Board of Orthopaedic Surgery, which was established at the Kahler Hotel in Rochester, Minnesota, on June 5, 1934. According to Wickstrom, Henderson and others established this board in reaction to difficulty gaining acceptance by the medical establishment in the eastern US:

“After all, in the opinion of the East Coast establishment, Henderson (who was born in St. Paul, was educated in Canada, and had his beginning with the Mayo brothers as a clinical assistant riding a bicycle around Rochester, making house calls on the Mayo brothers’ patients) was a mere upstart.”

By that time, he was 51 years old and had already served as president of the American Orthopaedic Association and Clinical Orthopaedic Society, and he was prominent in the American Medical Association and other organizations.

Henderson was one of three of the first 15 presidents of the American Academy of Orthopaedic Surgeons to have a son who succeeded him professionally as both president and director of orthopaedic surgery at the Mayo Clinic; the other two were Philip D. Wilson Jr. and John C. Wilson, Sr. He was greatly respected for his organizational abilities, particularly at the American Board of Orthopaedic Surgery, whose objectives were uncertain in the beginning and required his careful guidance. Henderson served on the board of trustees for the Mayo Clinic from 1924 to 1947, and he served as president or chairman of many other professional organizations.

In 1940, Henderson accepted a meeting with the then-controversial polio therapist Sister Elizabeth Kenny, who carried a letter of introduction from Australia. Henderson introduced her to a colleague at the Mayo clinic, the physical therapist Frank Krusen. Rather than dismissing her as an untrained nurse of polio patients, Henderson and Krusen referred her to an associate in Minneapolis, Minnesota. There, she demonstrated her work to doctors Miland Knapp and John Pohl, who headed the polio treatment centers and told her that she should stay.

Henderson operated on many famous athletes, actors, personalities from around the world, and he provided free surgery to patients as needed. He kept precise research notes on his surgeries and outcomes, and published numerous articles for medical journals.

== Personal life ==
Henderson married Mabel Lillian Christensen (1884–1959) on February 10, 1912, in Forest Lake, Minnesota. She was a nurse and a member of the first graduating class of St Mary's Nursing School. Their two sons were Melvin Starkey Henderson Jr. (1922–1965) and Edward Drewry Henderson, MD (1919–2007). He built his family home in the historic Pill Hill district of Rochester, Minnesota on Ninth Avenue SW.

Throughout his career, Henderson remained an amateur photographer. Disappearing into his darkroom when he had the opportunity, he later entered his photographs to document his family, friendships, and professional associates into his scrapbooks. Also an early fan of the movie camera, beginning in the 1920s, he documented many activities in hundreds and hundreds of feet of old black-and-white 16 mm movie reels of the Mayo family and fellow associates, his travels, and of his family, all in the possession of his family today.

Henderson died on June 17, 1954, in Rochester, Minnesota, from heart disease at the age of 71.
