= Sean E. McCance =

- Education: Fordham University, Columbia University
- Medical career
- Profession: orthopedic surgeon
- Institutions: Lenox Hill Hospital; Mount Sinai Medical Center
- Sub-specialties: spine surgery

Sean E. McCance is an American orthopedic surgeon and Co-Director of Spine Surgery in the Leni and Peter W. May Department of Orthopaedics at the Mount Sinai Medical Center in New York City. Additionally, he is an Associate Clinical Professor of Orthopaedics at the Mount Sinai School of Medicine and Attending Spine Physician at Lenox Hill Hospital.

McCance is the author of a chapter in Athletic Training and Sports Medicine (ISBN 0892031727) and was listed as one of the "Best Doctors" for spinal fusion in Money Magazine. He is a member of both the Scoliosis Research Society and the North American Spine Society.

== Biography ==
McCance received his B.S. in 1987 from Fordham University and his M.D. in 1991 from Columbia University College of Physicians and Surgeons. He completed an internship in general surgery at the Strong Memorial Hospital in Rochester, New York, in 1992 and a residency at the University of Rochester Medical Center in 1996. He completed a fellowship in spine surgery at the Twin Cities Spine Center in Minneapolis in 1997.

In 1997, McCance was named Coordinator of Spine Education and Assistant Adjunct of Orthopaedic Surgery at Lenox Hill Hospital in New York City. In 2000, he was named Clinical Assistant Professor at New York University School of Medicine and Attending Orthopedic Surgeon at NYU Medical Center. In 2000, he joined the Mount Sinai Medical Center as Attending Orthopedic Surgeon. In 2006, he was named Co-Director of Spine Surgery at Mount Sinai, and, in 2008, Clinical Associate Professor at the Mount Sinai School of Medicine.

McCance is a member of the Scoliosis Research Society, the North American Spine Society, the American Academy of Orthopaedic Surgeons, the American Medical Association and the Medical Society of the State of New York. Clinical interests include long-term outcomes of instrumented lumbar fusions for degenerative disease, innovative surgical techniques for spinal stenosis and cervical spine fixation techniques.

== Honors and awards ==
- 1986, Phi Beta Kappa
- 1996, Resident-Fellow Research Award, Eastern Orthopaedic Association
- 2003, "Best Doctors", Money Magazine, 2003
- 2005, 2006 “America's Top Physicians”

== Publications ==
- Sorin A, Voigt EP, McCance SE, Rossi AM, Lessow AS (June 2008). "Anterolateral approach to the lower cervical spine: a step-by-step description". Ear Nose Throat J. 87: E12–5. PMID 18561107.
- Parvataneni HK, Nicholas SJ, McCance SE (January 2004). "Bilateral pedicle stress fractures in a female athlete: case report and review of the literature". Spine. 29: E19–21. doi:10.1097/01.BRS.0000105988.43472.2B. PMID 14722420.
- Poynton AR, Nelson MC, McCance SE, Levine RL, O'Leary PF (June 2003). "Bovine thrombin induces an acquired coagulopathy in sensitized patients undergoing revision spinal surgery: a report of two cases". Spine. 28: E221–3. doi:10.1097/01.BRS.0000065491.60871.06. PMID 12811284.
- Mathews V, McCance SE, O'Leary PF (December 2001). "Early fracture of the sacrum or pelvis: an unusual complication after multilevel instrumented lumbosacral fusion". Spine. 26: E571–5. PMID 11740374.
- O'Leary PF, McCance SE (March 2001). "Distraction laminoplasty for decompression of lumbar spinal stenosis". Clin. Orthop. Relat. Res. (384): 26–34. PMID 11249174.
- McCance SE, Smith MD (December 1999). "Respiratory arrest after anterior cervical discectomy and arthrodesis in a patient with Down syndrome. A case report and review of the literature". J Bone Joint Surg Am. 81: 1741–3. PMID 10608386.
- McCance SE, Winter RB, Lonstein JE (June 1999). "A King type II curve pattern treated with selective thoracic fusion: case report with 44-year follow-up". J Spinal Disord. 12: 262–5. PMID 10382782.
- McCance SE, Denis F, Lonstein JE, Winter RB (October 1998). "Coronal and sagittal balance in surgically treated adolescent idiopathic scoliosis with the King II curve pattern. A review of 67 consecutive cases having selective thoracic arthrodesis". Spine. 23: 2063–73. PMID 9794050.
- McCance SE, DelSignore JL (August 1998). "Chronic displaced medial epicondyle fracture". Orthopedics. 21: 904–6. PMID 9731675.
- Totterman SM, Miller RJ, McCance SE, Meyers (Apr 1996). "MR findings with a three-dimensional gradient-recalled-echo sequence". Radiology. 199 (1): 227–32. PMID 8633149.
