= Orthopaedic Research Society =

Professional, scientific and medical organization focused on orthopaedic research

Orthopaedic Research Society (ORS)
- Formation: 1954
- Type: professional, scientific and medical society
- Headquarters: Rosemont, Illinois
- Region served: Worldwide
- President: Hicham Drissi
- Website: www.ors.org

The Orthopaedic Research Society (ORS) is a professional, scientific, and medical organization focused on orthopaedic research. The stated mission of the ORS is to advance orthopaedic research through education, collaboration, communication, and advocacy. The ORS aims to raise resources for orthopaedic research and increase the awareness of the impact of such research on patients and the public. Annual meetings are held across the US to discuss current research, with a number of awards available to further career trajectories of members.

== History ==
In 1940, the Research Committee of the American Academy of Orthopaedic Surgeons, chaired by Alfred R. Shands, conducted a survey of its members which indicated that over 180 members were conducting some type of research. This finding prompted several musculoskeletal investigators to express the desire for having a forum to present and share their work. Philip D. Wilson Jr., a member of the Academy, along with several others, met in San Francisco and proposed the idea of starting an organization focused solely on musculoskeletal research. This idea gained unanimous support from the American Academy of Orthopaedic Surgeons at their Annual Meeting in 1951.

In 1952, the first meeting of the founding members of the ORS took place. At this first meeting, Philip D. Wilson Jr. created a draft constitution and set of by-laws for the fledgling society. It was determined that the purpose of the society was to "encourage and coordinate investigation and research in basic principles or clinical problems related to the special field of Orthopaedic Surgery." Due to the unexpected death of Dallas B. Phemister, who had agreed to take on the role of chairman, the formal organization of the society was delayed.

1954 marked the first official meeting of the group at the Palmer House in Chicago under the Chairmanship of Wilson. At this first meeting there were twenty-nine people in attendance. Cultivating the relationship between clinicians and scientists while providing them with opportunities to come together and share ideas was the driving factor in establishing the society. "The close relationship of between clinicians and basic scientists would help ensure the prominent role of orthopaedic surgeons in delivering care to patients with injuries and diseases of the musculoskeletal system," explained Eugene R. Mindell, MD who served as president of the ORS from 1972–1973.

As of June 2018, membership had grown to more than 4,100 members from across the globe. Once a role only held by surgeons, in 1982 the ORS elected Van C. Mow as the first PhD president. Currently, Presidents are elected from each of the three disciplines represented in the membership: clinicians, biologists, and engineers.

Past presidents of the ORS have included Farshid Guilak and Marjolein C. van der Meulen.

== Research areas ==
Members of the ORS conduct cutting-edge research on the full range of musculoskeletal tissues : bone, tendon, cartilage & synovium, meniscus, skeletal muscle, and the intervertebral disc. Researchers focus on all aspects of these tissues, including development, structure and function, mechanics, diagnostics, injury and healing, and potential therapeutics. Special emphasis is given to pathologies that cause significant morbidity in patients, such as osteoarthritis, osteoporosis, osteopenia, rheumatoid arthritis, fracture healing, ACL tears, tendinopathies, and meniscus tears.

More recently a number of research subsections have been formed, starting with the Spine Section in 2015. These small communities bring together like-minded researchers with a focus on a specific topic of research. Since then, the number of sections has expanded to include: International Section of Fracture Repair, Meniscus Section, Orthopaedic Implants Section, Preclinical Models Section, Strategies in Clinical Research Section, and the Tendon Section. Each of these meets annually at the regular meeting, and some have added satellite meetings to create more opportunity for collaboration in their respective field.

== Research journals ==
=== Journal of Orthopaedic Research ===
The Journal of Orthopaedic Research is a peer-reviewed journal that is published in cooperation with John Wiley & Sons, Inc. The journal provides an essential forum for the orthopaedic community to share and communicate new information in the different research areas of orthopaedics, including life sciences, engineering, translational and clinical studies.

=== JOR Spine ===
JOR Spine is a fully open access and peer-reviewed journal that was established by the ORS. The journal provides a platform to share original and innovative information focusing on basic and translational research of the spine. Publications in this journal include the following topics in spine research: ageing, biomaterials, biomechanics, bioreactors, degeneration, genetics, inflammation, pain, remodeling, tissue engineering, etc.

=== Journal of the American Academy of Orthopaedic Surgeons - On the Horizon ===
Coordinated by the ORS Basic Science Education Committee, On the Horizon presents brief articles discussing current scientific investigations that may have future orthopaedic clinical applications. This feature was previously presented quarterly in the Journal of the American Academy of Orthopaedic Surgeons (January, April, July, and October), where archived articles remain available.

== Partners of ORS ==
The ORS is invested in developing partnerships and collaborations dedicated to research, outreach and education worldwide:

- American Academy of Orthopaedic Surgeons (AAOS)
- Orthopaedic Research and Education Foundation (OREF)
- International Combined Orthopaedic Research Societies (I-CORS)
- International Federation of Musculoskeletal Research Societies (IFMRS)
- American Institute for Medical and Biological Engineering Council of Societies (AIMBE)
- Research!America

== Educational resources and outreach ==
=== LearnORS ===
LearnORS is an online platform that offers courses suited for PhD candidates, medical students, postdoctoral fellows, orthopaedic residents, orthopaedic fellows, and industry researchers interested in learning more about orthopaedic research. Courses include those geared towards improving grant writing, basic musculoskeletal science, and clinical research, among others.

=== The Musculoskeletal Knowledge Portal ===
The Musculoskeletal Knowledge Portal (MSK-KP) is currently in development by a team of scientists and software engineers at the Broad Institute in collaboration with the International Federation of Musculoskeletal Research Societies (IFMRS). The site enables browsing, searching, and analysis of human genomic information associated with musculoskeletal traits and pathology.

=== Open Door ===
ORS Open Door is an outreach activity aimed at communicating orthopaedic/musculoskeletal science to the general public, and takes place during the annual meeting in the local community. Open Door 2023’s target audience was middle school- and high school-aged students from the Dallas area, with the goal of sharing potential careers and topics in musculoskeletal science to under-represented minorities and first-generation students in STEM (science, technology, engineering, mathematics) fields.

Open Door 2024 will be held in Long Beach CA just prior to the annual meeting.
