= Parvizi =

Parvizi is a surname. Notable people with the surname include:

- Javad Parvizi (born 1965), American orthopaedic surgeon
- Khosrow Parvizi (1933–2012), Iranian director
- Rasoul Parvizi (1920–1977), Iranian storyteller and politician
