= Khaled Saleh =

Khaled Saleh may refer to:

- Khaled Al Saleh (born 1988), Syrian football player
- Khaled J. Saleh, American orthopedic surgeon
- Khaled Mohammed Saleh (born 2000), Qatari footballer
