= John Robert Cobb =

American orthopedic surgeon (1903–1967)

- Born: February 28, 1903; Brooklyn, New York City (United States)
- Died: March 24, 1967 (aged 64)
- Education: Brown University; Harvard University; Yale University
- Known for: The Cobb Angle
- Scientific career
- Fields: medicine, physics

John Robert Cobb (1903–1967), was an American orthopedic surgeon who invented the eponymous Cobb angle, the preferred method of measuring the degree of scoliosis and post-traumatic kyphosis.

== Education ==
Born and raised in Brooklyn, New York City, John R. Cobb attended the Staunton Military Academy in Virginia, and enlisted on a merchant ship at the age of 16. He studied English Literature at Brown University in Providence, Rhode Island and earned a Bachelor of Arts in literature in 1925. In his senior year at Brown he decided on a career in medicine and attended Harvard University for one year of post-graduate study in biological sciences. He then attended Yale Medical School, from which he graduated with an MD in 1930. He served a one-year surgical internship and a one-year medical residency in orthopedic surgery at Yale – New Haven Hospital. In 1934 Dr. Cobb became the Gibney Orthopedic Fellow at the 'Hospital for the Ruptured and Crippled' in New York City. In 1936 he received a Doctor of Medical Sciences degree from Columbia University.

== Career ==
During his work after 1934 at the Hospital for Ruptured and Crippled, Dr. Cobb developed and led the Margaret Caspary scoliosis clinic. At this time, little was known about scoliosis or its cause, and there were few effective treatments. Cobb experimented with various methods and concluded that the most effective approach was to use a turnbuckle plaster jacket in combination with spinal fusion. His studies of thousands of patients showed that only 10% of patients with scoliosis require such surgery. To obtain an accurate and consistent assessment of the severity of spinal deformity, so as to avoid unnecessary surgery, Cobb developed a simple and reliable method for measuring the angle of curvature which has become known as the Cobb angle.
John Robert Cobb died on March 24, 1967.

=== Positions ===
- Professor of orthopedic surgery at the New York Polyclinic Medical School and Hospital
- Orthopedic surgeon to the Seaview Hospital on Staten Island
- Assistant visiting orthopedist at the Willard Parker Hospital
- Consultant on the staff of the

St. Charles’ Hospital, in Port Jefferson, Long Island,
Eastern New York Orthopedic Hospital School, in Schenectady,
Veterans Administration Hospital, in Castle Point.

- Fellow of the New York Academy of Medicine

=== Memberships ===
- American Medical Writers Association
- Association of American Medical Colleges
- American Academy of Orthopedic Surgeons
- American Medical Association
- American Geriatrics Society
- President of the Alumni Association of the Hospital for Special Surgery
