= Spinal posture =

Concept in anatomy

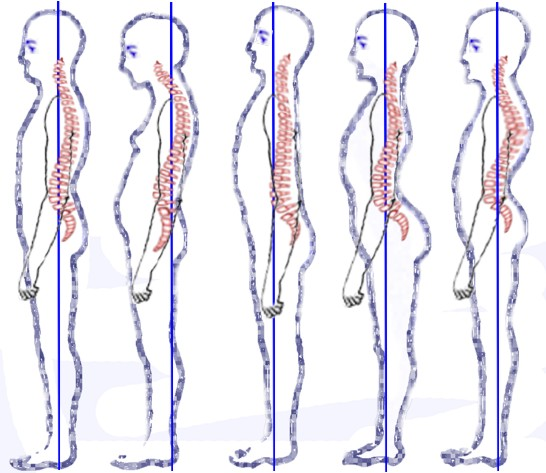

Spinal posture is the position of the spine in the human body. It is debated what the optimal spinal posture is, and whether poor spinal posture causes lower back pain. Good spinal posture may help develop balance, strength and flexibility.

== Neutral spine ==
Looking directly at the front or back of the body in a standing posture, the 33 vertebrae in the spinal column should appear completely vertical. From a side view, the cervical (neck) region of the spine (C1–C7) is bent inward, the thoracic (upper back) region (T1–T12) bends outward, and the lumbar (lower back) region (L1–L5) bends inward. The sacrum (tailbone area) (S1–S5 fused) and coccyx (on average 4 fused) rest between the pelvic bones. A neutral pelvis is in fact slightly anteriorly rotated which means the anterior superior iliac spines should be just in front of the pubic symphysis, not in the same vertical line.

== Posture abnormalities ==
In medicine and occupations concerned with physical fitness, the concept of good posture is referred to as "neutral spine". In this context, proper posture or "neutral spine", is the proper alignment of the body between postural extremes. Deviations from neutral alignment are identified as excessive curvature or reduction in curvature. Rarely do these deviations in curvature occur in only one plane; however, they are typically referred to in this manner. In the anterior/posterior view, deviation from vertical results in abnormal lateral curvature of the spine called scoliosis. In the sagittal view, excessive curvature in the cervical region is cervical lordosis, in the thoracic region thoracic kyphosis, and in the lumbar region lumbar lordosis. Reduction in curvature is typically termed flat back if present in the thoracic region and lumbar kyphosis if present in the lumbar region. In posture analysis, the spine is compared to a plumb line to detect the aforementioned abnormalities. From the anterior/posterior view, this plumb line should run vertically down the midline of the body, dividing it symmetrically into right and left halves indicating even weight distribution on left and right sides. From the sagittal view the plumb line should bisect the ear, odontoid process of C2, the cervical vertebral bodies, the center of the glenohumeral joint, the lumbar vertebral bodies, the center of the acetabulum, just posterior to the patella, and through the tarsals of the feet. This sagittal line of reference theoretically indicates even distribution of weight between the front and the back of the body.

== Quantifying abnormalities ==
Scoliosis is well established and even evaluated at an early age. It is typically quantified using the standardized Cobb angle method. This method consists of measuring the degree of deformity by the angle between two successive vertebrae. The Cobb method was accepted by the Scoliosis Research Society (SRS) in 1966. It serves as the standard method for quantification of scoliosis deformities. Sagittal plane posture aberrations such as cervical and lumbar lordosis and thoracic kyphosis have yet to be quantified due to considerable inter-individual variability in normal sagittal curvature. The Cobb method was also one of the first techniques used to quantify sagittal deformity. As a 2D measurement technique it has limitations and new techniques are being proposed for measurement of these curvatures. Most recently, 3D imaging techniques using computed tomography (CT) and magnetic resonance (MR) have been attempted. These techniques are promising but lack the reliability and validity necessary to be used as a reference for clinical purposes.
