= David B. Levine =

American orthopaedic surgeon (born 1932)

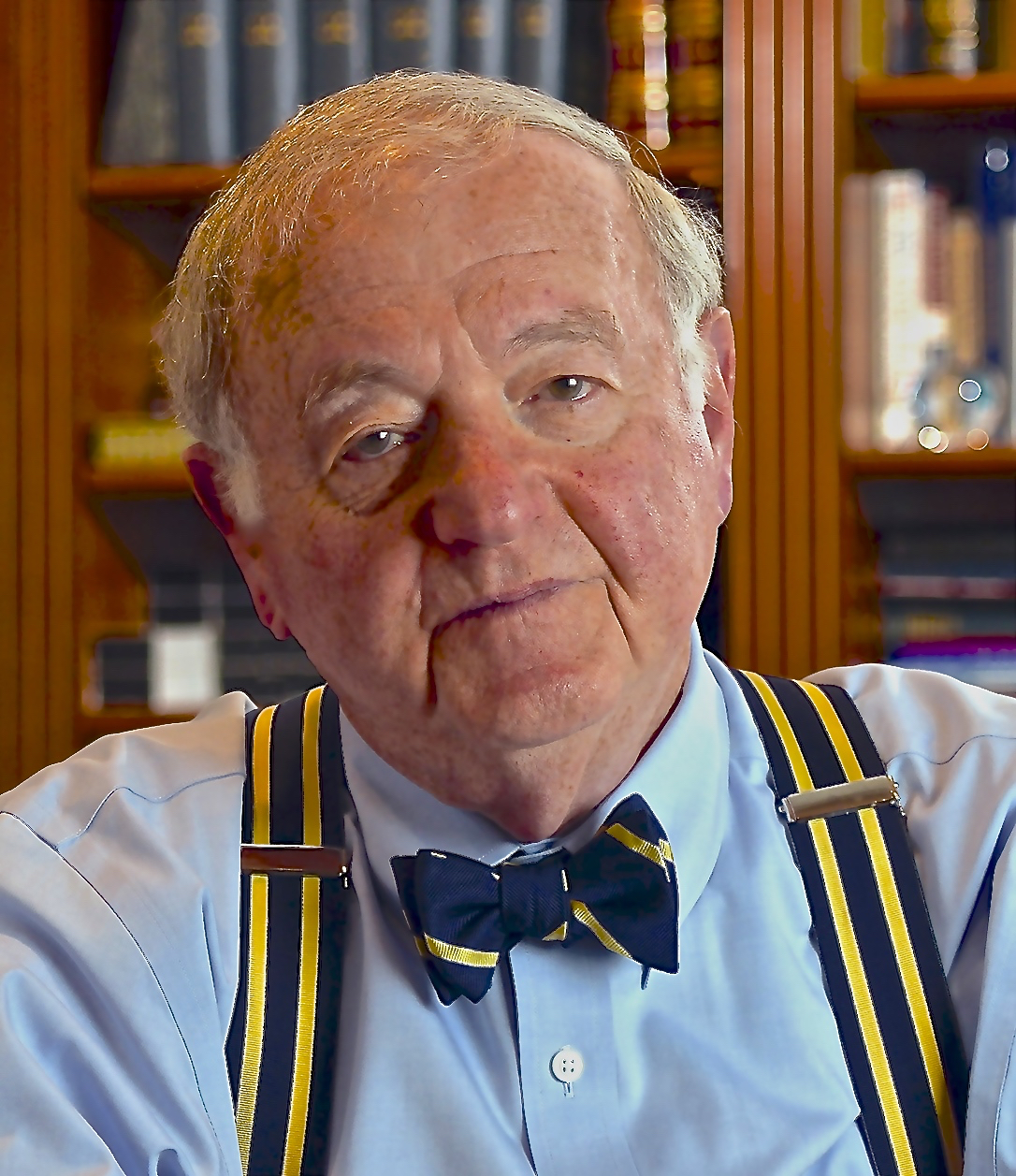
- Born: 1932 (age 93–94); Binghamton, New York
- Education: Dartmouth College (BA); State University of New York Upstate Medical University (MD)
- Occupation: Orthopedic Surgeon
- Spouse: Janet Levine (Cohen)
- Medical career
- Institutions: Weill Cornell Medical College; Hospital for Special Surgery; New York-Presbyterian Hospital; Rockefeller University
- Sub-specialties: Spinal surgery, scoliosis

David B. Levine is an orthopaedic surgeon, hospital administrator, professor and historian of medicine who has held positions since 1961 at the Hospital for Special Surgery in New York City, New York.

== Early life, education, and residencies ==
Levine was born to Sarah and Herbert Levine in 1932 in Binghamton, NY, and attended public schools there. He studied from 1950 to 1953 at Dartmouth College and graduated in 1957 with an M.D. degree from State University of New York Upstate Medical University at Syracuse.

From 1957 to 1958, he worked as a Rotating Intern at the Case Western Reserve's Metropolitan General Hospital in Cleveland, Ohio. From 1958 to 1959 he was an Assistant Surgical Resident at Beth Israel Hospital (now known as Beth Israel Deaconess Medical Center) in Boston, Massachusetts, and also during this year was an instructor in surgery at Harvard Medical School.

From 1959 to 1961, he served at the rank of lieutenant in the U.S. Navy as the medical officer aboard the USS Forrestal in the Sixth Fleet.

== Practice at Hospital for Special Surgery ==
During 1961–1964, Levine served as an Orthopaedic Resident at the Hospital for Special Surgery. In 1965–1966 he served as an orthopaedic spine fellow at the Rancho Los Amigos Hospital in Downey, California. From 1965 to 1966, he was a spine fellow at the Los Angeles General Hospital, where he was also an instructor in Orthopedic Surgery at the University of Southern California. In 1967, he was certified by the American Board of Orthopaedic Surgery.

From 1966 to 1995, Levine was on the attending staff at Hospital for Special Surgery (HSS), as an orthopaedic surgeon. He held the titles of Chief of the Scoliosis Service (1968–1995), and Director of the Department of Orthopedic Surgery (1987–1990). As Chairman of the Orthopedic Residency Training Program (1987–1990), he streamlined the application process, helping to introduce one of the first computerized scoring processes and adding a psychologist interview session.

He taught for over thirty years at Cornell University Medical College, and from 1978 to 1995 held the title of Professor of Clinical Orthopaedic Surgery at the Weill Cornell Medical College. From 1979 to 1982, Dr. Levine was an Alumni Council Trustee of the college.

In addition, he was a surgeon at The New York Hospital, and the Bronx Veterans Administration Hospital. From 1976 to 1980, he was Visiting Associate Physician at The Rockefeller University Hospital in New York City.

During his career, Levine published over 65 peer reviewed articles, 16 books and chapters and gave more than 300 invited presentations. He was the proposer of the Scoliosis Research Society in 1964, a founding member and its president from 1978 to 1979, serving on the board of directors for fifteen years. In 2010, the Society, now a highly recognized international organization, presented him with its "Lifetime Achievement Award."

In 2006, the hospital announced the creation of The David B. Levine Endowed Clinical Research Chair.

== Historian of medicine and early immunotherapy research ==
In 1995, Levine retired from active patient care and the next year moved to Florence, Italy with his wife Janet, an artist, where he lectured at Careggi University Orthopaedic Hospital, studied antique furniture restoration and perfected his Italian cooking. He returned to New York in 1997, purchased a farm in Columbia County, New York, restored a 19th-century home, tended an organic garden, boarded black Angus cattle, cared for a raft of ducks, and a herd of homeless sheep and goats.

In 2003 Levine became the Director of the Alumni Association at Hospital for Special Surgery (HSS). In concert with the 150th anniversary of HSS he published the definitive history of the hospital in 2013 titled, Anatomy of a Hospital. History of the Hospital for Special Surgery, 1863–2013.

Levine has pursued history of medicine, and given presentations on medicine during the Civil War. From the beginning of the Civil War in April 1861, until the Confederate States surrendered in April 1865, the casualties and deaths on both sides were monumental, changing the face of medical care, resulting in the creation of the Army Medical Corps.

Levine has spoken about the history of cancer immunotherapy research at Hospital for Special Surgery. Dr. William Coley (January 12, 1862 – April 16, 1936), (the 3rd surgeon-in-chief at the hospital when it was called The Hospital for the Ruptured and Crippled) who developed Coley's Toxins, investigated the field.

== Selected writings ==
- Levine DB (2013). Anatomy of a Hospital. Hospital for Special Surgery 1863–2013. New York, NY: Print Matters, Inc. ISBN 0979668522, ISBN 978-0979668524.
- Anand, N; Levine, DB; Burke, S; Bansal, M (1997). "Neuropathic spinal atrophy in Charcot-Marie-Tooth disease". J Bone Joint Surg. 79-A: 1235–39. doi:10.2106/00004623-199708000-00017.
- Dhuper, S; Ehlers, KH; Fatica, NS; Myridakis, DJ; Klein, AA; Friedman, DM; Levine, DB (1997). "Incidence and risk factors for mitral valve prolapse in severe adolescent idiopathic scoliosis". Pediatr Cardiol. 18 (6): 425–8. doi:10.1007/s002469900220. PMID 9326688.
- Cole, BJ; Flics, S; Levine, DB (1998). "Optimizing hospital reimbursement through physician awareness: a step toward better patient care". Orthopedics. 21 (1): 79–83. doi:10.3928/0147-7447-19980101-17. PMID 9474635.
- Wilson, PD; Levine, DB (2000). "Hospital for special surgery. A brief review of its development and current position". Clin. Orthop. Relat. Res. (374): 90–106. doi:10.1097/00003086-200005000-00008. PMID 10818970.
- Levine, DB (2005). "Hospital for Special Surgery: origin and early history first site 1863-1870". HSS J. 1 (1): 3–8. doi:10.1007/s11420-005-0116-0. PMC 2504132. PMID 18751802.
- Levine, DB (2006). "The Hospital for the Ruptured and Crippled: Knight to Gibney, 1870-1887". HSS J. 2 (1): 1–6. doi:10.1007/s11420-005-0138-7. PMC 2504108. PMID 18751838.
- Levine, DB (2006). "Gibney as surgeon-in-chief: The earlier years, 1887–1900". J HSS. 2 (2): 95–101. doi:10.1007/s11420-006-9008-1. PMC 2488170. PMID 18751820.
- Levine, DB (2007). "The Hospital for the Ruptured and Crippled, Entering the twentieth century, ca. 1900 to 1912". J HSS. 3 (1): 2–12. doi:10.1007/s11420-006-9024-1. PMC 2504092. PMID 18751765.
- Levine, DB (2007). "The Hospital for the Ruptured and Crippled moves east on 42nd Street 1912 to 1925". J HSS. 3 (2): 131–136. doi:10.1007/s11420-007-9051-6. PMC 2504267.
- Levine, DB (2008). "The Hospital for the Ruptured and Crippled: William Bradley Coley, third Surgeon-in-Chief 1925-1933". HSS J. 4 (1): 1–9. doi:10.1007/s11420-007-9063-2. PMC 2504278. PMID 18751855.
- Levine, DB (2008). "The Hospital for the Ruptured and Crippled, Eugene H. Pool, fourth surgeon-in-chief 1933–1935, followed by Philip D. Wilson, fifth surgeon-in-chief 1935". J HSS. 4 (1): 97–106. doi:10.1007/s11420-008-9081-8. PMC 2553161.
- Levine, DB (2009). "The Hospital for the Ruptured and Crippled renamed the Hospital for Special Surgery 1940; the war years 1941-1945". HSS J. 5 (1): 1–8. doi:10.1007/s11420-008-9093-4. PMC 2642546. PMID 19048348.
- Levine, DB (2009). "The Hospital for Special Surgery affiliates with Cornell University Medical College and New York Hospital, 1951; Philip D. Wilson retires as surgeon-in-chief, 1955". J HSS. 5 (2): 83–91. doi:10.1007/s11420-009-9120-0. PMC 2744758. PMID 19506964.
- Levine, DB (2010). "The Hospital for Special Surgery 1955 to 1972: T. Campbell Thompson serves as sixth surgeon-in-chief 1955–1963 followed by Robert Lee Patterson, Jr. the seventh surgeon-in-chief 1963–1972". J HSS. 6 (1): 1–13. doi:10.1007/s11420-009-9136-5. PMC 2821498. PMID 19885704.
- Levine, DB (2010). "The Hospital for Special Surgery 1972–1989; Philip D. Wilson, Jr., eighth surgeon-in-chief". J HSS. 6 (2): 119–133. doi:10.1007/s11420-010-9162-3. PMC 2926356. PMID 21886524.
- Levine, DB (2015). "Origin & Early Years of the Scoliosis Research Society 1966–1979". Spine Deform. 3 (5): 392–401. doi:10.1016/j.jspd.2015.06.002. PMID 27927525.
