= Shepard Hurwitz =

American orthopedic surgeon

Shepard R. Hurwitz is an American orthopedic surgeon who is both author and coauthor of over 100 peer reviewed articles. He works at the University of North Carolina at Chapel Hill in Chapel Hill, North Carolina. He obtained his medical degree through the Columbia University College of Physicians and Surgeons and was a practitioner in several university health systems for 38 years. Currently he holds a faculty position at the University of North Carolina- Chapel Hill and is a past executive director of the American Board of Orthopaedic Surgery. In 2011 he was presented with the 2011 VOS Career Award.
