= Marjolein van der Meulen =

Marjolein Christine Hermance van der Meulen is an American engineer who served as the James M. and Marsha McCormick Director of Biomedical Engineering at Cornell University from 2014-2024. She is a Swanson Professor of Biomedical Engineering and a Senior Scientist in the Research Division of the Hospital for Special Surgery.

== Biography ==
=== Education ===
van der Meulen received her BS in Mechanical Engineering at the Massachusetts Institute of Technology in 1987. She went on to graduate from Stanford University with a MS and PhD in Mechanical Engineering in 1989 and 1993 respectively.

=== Career ===
van der Meulen worked at the Rehabilitation R&D Center of the Department of Veterans Affairs in Palo Alto, California for three years as a biomedical engineer before joining Cornell University as a professor.

She currently runs the van der Meulen research group at Cornell University. van der Meulen's research in the field of orthopaedic biomechanics "focuses on the interaction between mechanical stimuli and the skeleton, and the mechanical properties of musculoskeletal tissues." In 2013, the van der Meulen research group created a model that simulates prolonged joint loading and published a study in the journal Arthritis and Rheumatism.

=== Honors and awards ===
Some of van der Meulen's honors include:

- Fellow (American Institute for Medical and Biological Engineering, 2008)
- Fellow (American Society of Mechanical Engineers, 2010)
- Robert '55 and Vanne '57 Cowie Excellence in Teaching Award (Cornell University, College of Engineering, 2011)
- Fellow (American Association for the Advancement of Science, 2015)
- Women's Leadership Award (Orthopaedic Research Society, 2015)
- van der Meulen is a member of the American Society of Bone and Mineral Research, the American and European Societies of Biomechanics, and the Orthopaedic Research Society.
- President of the Orthopaedic Research Society (Orthopaedic Research Society), 2022-2023
- Fellow (Orthopaedic Research Society, 2024)
- Recipient, H.R. Lissner Medal, 2024 (Bioengineering Division of ASME) in recognition of outstanding achievement in the field of bioengineering.

=== Personal life ===
van der Meulen is Dutch-American.
