= Javad Parvizi =

- Education: Sheffield Medical School
- Awards: Chitranjan Singh Ranawat Award
- Scientific career
- Workplaces: Rothman Orthopaedic Institute; Thomas Jefferson University; Acibadem University
- Website: www.javadparvizi.com

Javad Parvizi (born 1965) is an American board-certified orthopedic surgeon with experience in joint reconstruction.

According to his official website, he reports having performed over 10,000 joint replacements and more than 2,000 joint preservation procedures during his time associated with the Rothman Orthopaedic Institute and Thomas Jefferson University in Philadelphia.

He completed his medical degree in the United Kingdom, undertook residency training at the Mayo Clinic in Rochester, and completed fellowship training in Bern, Switzerland.

He holds honorary memberships in multiple international orthopaedic societies and has authored more than 1,000 peer-reviewed publications; his citation impact is substantial (H-index reported on Google Scholar).

Parvizi has served in leadership roles within specialty societies, including as president of the Musculoskeletal Infection Society (MSIS) and as president of the American Association of Hip and Knee Surgeons (AAHKS).

He served as president of the Eastern Orthopaedic Association in 2018.

Parvizi is currently professor of Orthopedic Surgery at Acibadem University in Istanbul and performs surgery at the International Joint Center.

== Early life and education ==
Parvizi was born in Zanjan, Azerbaijan, Iran in 1965. He lived there until the age of 16.

He trained in the United Kingdom, the United States and Switzerland. He earned his medical degree from the University of Sheffield, UK in 1991 and then underwent specialist surgical training in Newcastle, UK. In 1995, he moved to Rochester, US, to the Mayo Clinic as a research fellow and graduate student. In 1997 he obtained a Master of Science in Orthopaedics from the Mayo Foundation at the Mayo Clinic. He then started a residency in Orthopaedic Surgery at the Mayo Clinic. After finishing the residency in 2002, he was awarded the Hip Society-Muller Foundation Fellowship in Adult Reconstruction to spend additional surgical training at the Insalspital Hospital at the University of Berne, Switzerland. In Berne, he worked with Dr. Maurice Edmond Müller and Professor Reinhold Ganz to learn joint preservation surgical management of the hip. After his training in Bern, he joined the Rothman Institute in 2003, where he has remained to date.

== Research and career ==
The most important area of Parvizi's research is infections following joint replacement and on the bacterial free-floating biofilms that form in human joint infections. He also did research on low-dose aspirin, finding it to be effective as higher-dose aspirin for the prevention of venous thromboembolism, and to be associated with fewer gastrointestinal side effects.

Parvizi is a joint replacement surgeon at the International Joint Center, Acibadem Maslak Hospital, Istanbul. He also serves at the Acibadem University as a professor of orthopedics and trauma.

== Awards and honors ==
Parvizi has received multiple awards and honours during his career, including:

- Chitranjan Singh Ranawat Award (The Knee Society)
- Insall Award (Knee Society)
- Mark Coventry Award
- Otto Aufranc Award (The Hip Society)
- ASHP Best Practice Award (American Society of Health-System Pharmacists)
- J.R. Neff Award (Musculoskeletal Transplant Foundation)
- Jon T. Mader Award (Musculoskeletal Infection Society) — recipient of awards for best clinical papers at MSIS meetings
- Vernon Nickel Award (Orthopedic Rehabilitation Association)
- Frank Stinchfield Award (The Hip Society)

In addition to these honours, Parvizi has been recognised with a range of other discipline-specific awards and has held leadership roles in professional societies and foundations; for example, he has served on the board of directors of the Maurice E. Muller Foundation of North America.

== Patents ==
Parvizi has been named as an inventor on a number of patent applications and granted patents related to orthopaedic implants, diagnostics and biomaterials. Selected patents and published patent applications include:

- Materials and methods for diagnosis of peri-implant bone and joint infections using prophenoloxidase pathway (2017)
- Methods utilizing D-dimer for diagnosis of periprosthetic joint infection (2017)
- Covalent modification of decellularized allogeneic grafts with active pharmaceuticals (2017)
- Methods utilizing D-dimer for diagnosis of periprosthetic joint infection** — Published application **US 2020/0225246 A1** (publication date: 16 July 2020
- Bottle (design patent) — U.S. Design Patent **D897,850** (grant date: 6 October 2020). Inventors include Javad Parvizi and colleagues; assignee Orthophor, LLC.

Additional patents and publications naming Parvizi as an inventor or co-inventor are listed in the inventor/patent list.

== Books ==
- Orthopedic Examination Made Easy. Amazon Books. 2006. ISBN 978-0443100017
- Operative Techniques in Joint Reconstruction Surgery. 2016. ISBN 978-1451193060
- High Yield Orthopaedics. Elsevier. 2010. ISBN 978-1416002369
- Essentials in Total Hip Arthroplasty. Slack Incorporated. 2009. ISBN 978-1556428708
- Operative Techniques in Adult Reconstruction Surgery. Lippincott Williams and Wilkins. 2010. ISBN 978-1451102628

== Publications ==
- Javad Parvizi, and Kyung-Hoi Koo. "Should a Urinary Tract Infection Be Treated before a Total Joint Arthroplasty?". Journal of Hip and Pelvis.
- Javad Parvizi, Thorsten Gehrke, Michael A. Mont, and John J. Callaghan. "Introduction: Proceedings of International Consensus on Orthopedic Infections". The Journal of Arthroplasty.
- Javad Parvizi, Laurent Sedel, and Michael Dunbar. "Clinical Faceoff: Instability After THA The Potential Role of the Bearing Surface". Journal of Clinical Orthopaedics and Related Research.
- Javad Parvizi, Jessica R Benson, and Jeffrey M Muir. "A new mini-navigation tool allows accurate component placement during anterior total hip arthroplasty". Journal of Dovepress.
- Javad Parvizi, Timothy L.Tan, Karan Goswami, Carlos Higuera, Craig Della Valle, Antonia F.Chen, and Noam Shohat. "The 2018 Definition of Periprosthetic Hip and Knee Infection: An Evidence-Based and Validated Criteria". The Journal of Arthroplasty.
