= Musculoskeletal causes of back pain =

Most cases of back pain are related to issues in human musculoskeletal system and are not related to severe diseases. Musculoskeletal problems also called mechanical because many of them linked to vertebrae physical motions.

== Description ==
Back pain itself is not considered a diagnosis, but rather a symptom of underlying (in most cases musculoskeletal) problems. following:

- Vertebrae misalignment, which can cause nerve interference (also called subluxation), muscle tension, or muscle spasm
- Strained muscles
- Sprained ligaments
- Ruptured disks, which also called "slipped", or herniated disks
- Degenerative discs (lose their cushioning ability). The degeneration usually caused by repetitive strain, or injury, or aging.
- Irritated joints

== Back pain recurrence risk reduction ==
- Use safe lifting technique, don't bend over, and maintain your back straight when lifting heavy objects
- Push instead of pulling when moving heavy objects
- Stay active: regular exercises and physical activities help to maintain back muscles and ligaments strong. In turn, strong back muscles provide better support for spine to keep the vertebrae properly aligned, which can ease the back pain and reduce the risk of chronic back pain returning. Although, for acute back pain exercises usually not recommended and physical activity should be slow, but it is critical to keep moving as much as possible, because inactivity leads to weakening back muscles and ligaments, and to gain more weight, which might exacerbate back pain.
- Sit Up Straight! The way you sit may either cause or help to prevent back pain.
- Maintain proper posture: In many cases poor posture (also called bad posture) is the root cause of back pain because of more stress on the disks and less back muscles activity. Most common bad posture samples are round back, sway back, forward head, excessive anterior and exterior pelvis tilts. Proper standing, sitting, and lifting techniques help to reduce the risk of back pain returning. Good posture trains and strengthens back muscles naturally. Maintaining good posture when walking, standing, and sitting in addition to standard medical treatments (and alternative therapies such as chiropractic manipulations) is likely to address the roots of many back pain problems.
