= John Insall =

English orthopaedic surgeon

John Nevil Insall
- Born: 1930; Bournemouth, England
- Died: 30 December 2000 (aged 70); Manhattan, New York, US
- Education: London Hospital Medical School
- Occupation: Orthopaedic surgeon
- Known for: Development of knee surgery techniques and prostheses

John Nevil Insall (1930 – 30 December 2000) was an English orthopaedic surgeon who contributed extensively to the advancement of orthopaedic surgery and total knee replacement surgery. Insall designed four models of widely used systems, including the Total Condylar Knee in 1974. Insall is known as the father of total knee replacement surgery.

== Early life and education ==
Insall was born in Bournemouth, England. He attended Corpus Christi College, Cambridge, graduating in 1953. In 1956, he earned his medical degree from London Hospital Medical School.

== Career ==
Insall worked as a physician and orthopaedic surgeon in England and Canada before joining the Hospital for Special Surgery (HSS) in New York City in 1961.

Insall worked with Peter Walker on the design of the Duocondylar prosthesis in 1970, and the later Duopatellar prosthesis. However, unsatisfied with these designs, Insall moved away from nonconforming posterior cruciate-retaining implants and hinged implants being developed at the time, instead focusing on creating a non-linked surface replacement with conforming surfaces, to be installed in a procedure that would sacrifice the posterior cruciate ligament. He developed the Total Condylar Prosthesis, along with surgical techniques for releasing the cruciate ligaments, and completed the first implant in February 1974. He later refined the design with the Total Condylar Prosthesis II, which sought to address posterior displacement in flexion, and which was implanted from 1976 to 1977.

The design suffered from issues causing early loosening, and so Insall collaborated with Albert Burstein to create the first Insall-Burstein Posterior Stabilized (IB) prosthesis, which had a mechanism that compensated for the missing cruciate ligament, controlled femoral rollback, and increased range of motion in the joint. In 1988, they developed a second version of the design (IB II) which had a modular tibial tray to allow for augments and stem extensions.

In the mid-1990s, Insall developed the NexGen Legacy Posterior-Stabilized Knee Prosthesis, a successor to the IB II intended to improve patellar femoral tracking. He also developed the LPS-Flex Knee Prosthesis, aiming to allow for high degrees of flexion for patients whose social and religious activities (such as Muslim prayers) require deep flexion. Working to reduce contact stresses to address issues with wear and osteolysis, Insall also developed the Mobile Bearing Knee prosthesis.

In 1987, Insall was elected president of the Knee Society.

In 1991, he founded the Insall Scott Kelly Institute for Orthopaedics and Sports Medicine (ISK) at Beth Israel Medical Center in New York City.

In addition to his textbook Surgery of the Knee, Insall wrote and edited approximately 150 peer-reviewed articles, 41 book chapters and 5 books.

Insall died of lung cancer on 30 December 2000, at Beth Israel Medical Center. A founding member of the Knee Society, the John Insall Award was subsequently established to honour Insall's achievements and contributions to orthopaedics.

== Personal life ==
Insall had two children with his first wife, Susan. He later married Mary V. Insall.
