= Leon Root =

American physician (1929–2015)

Leon Root (June 15, 1929 – September 21, 2015) was the former Chief of Pediatric Orthopaedics at the Hospital for Special Surgery. He was President of the American Academy for Cerebral Palsy and Developmental Medicine in 1988. Dr. Root wrote the popular "No More Aching Back" in 1992. He died at the age of 86 in September 2015.

== Education ==
- MD, New York Medical College, New York, New York, US
- Fellowship, Hospital for Special Surgery, New York, New York, US

== Selected awards ==
- President American Academy of Cerebral Palsy and Developmental Medicine 1988
- Chairman Orthopaedic Section of New York Academy of Medicine

== Selected writings ==
- Root, L (2009). "Surgical treatment for hip pain in the adult cerebral palsy patient". Dev Med Child Neurol. 51 Suppl 4: 84–91. doi:10.1111/j.1469-8749.2009.03421.x. PMID 19740214..
- Raphael, BS; Dines, JS; Akerman, M; Root, L (2010). "Long-term followup of total hip arthroplasty in patients with cerebral palsy". Clin. Orthop. Relat. Res. 468: 1845–54. doi:10.1007/s11999-009-1167-1. PMC 2881999. PMID 19924492..
- Widmann, RF; Laplaza, FJ; Bitan, FD; Brooks, CE; Root, L (2002). "Quality of life in osteogenesis imperfecta". Int Orthop. 26: 3–6. PMC 3620845. PMID 11954845..
