= Familial synovial chondromatosis with dwarfism =

- Other names: Synovial chondromatosis, familial with dwarfism
- Specialty: Medical genetics
- Symptoms: Combination of synovial chondromatosis and dwarfism
- Usual onset: Birth
- Duration: Lifelong
- Prevention: none
- Prognosis: good
- Frequency: rare
- Deaths: –

Familial synovial chondromatosis with dwarfism is a rare genetic disorder characterized by a combination of both synovial chondromatosis and dwarfism. Only 3 families from Germany and the United States worldwide have been described with the disorder, and they showed either X-linked or autosomal dominant inheritance.
