= Synovial chondromatosis =

- Other names: Synovial osteochondromatosis, synovial chondrosis, Reichel syndrome, synovial chondrometaplasia (not recommended) primary synovial osteochondromatosis, Reichel-Jones-Henderson syndrome
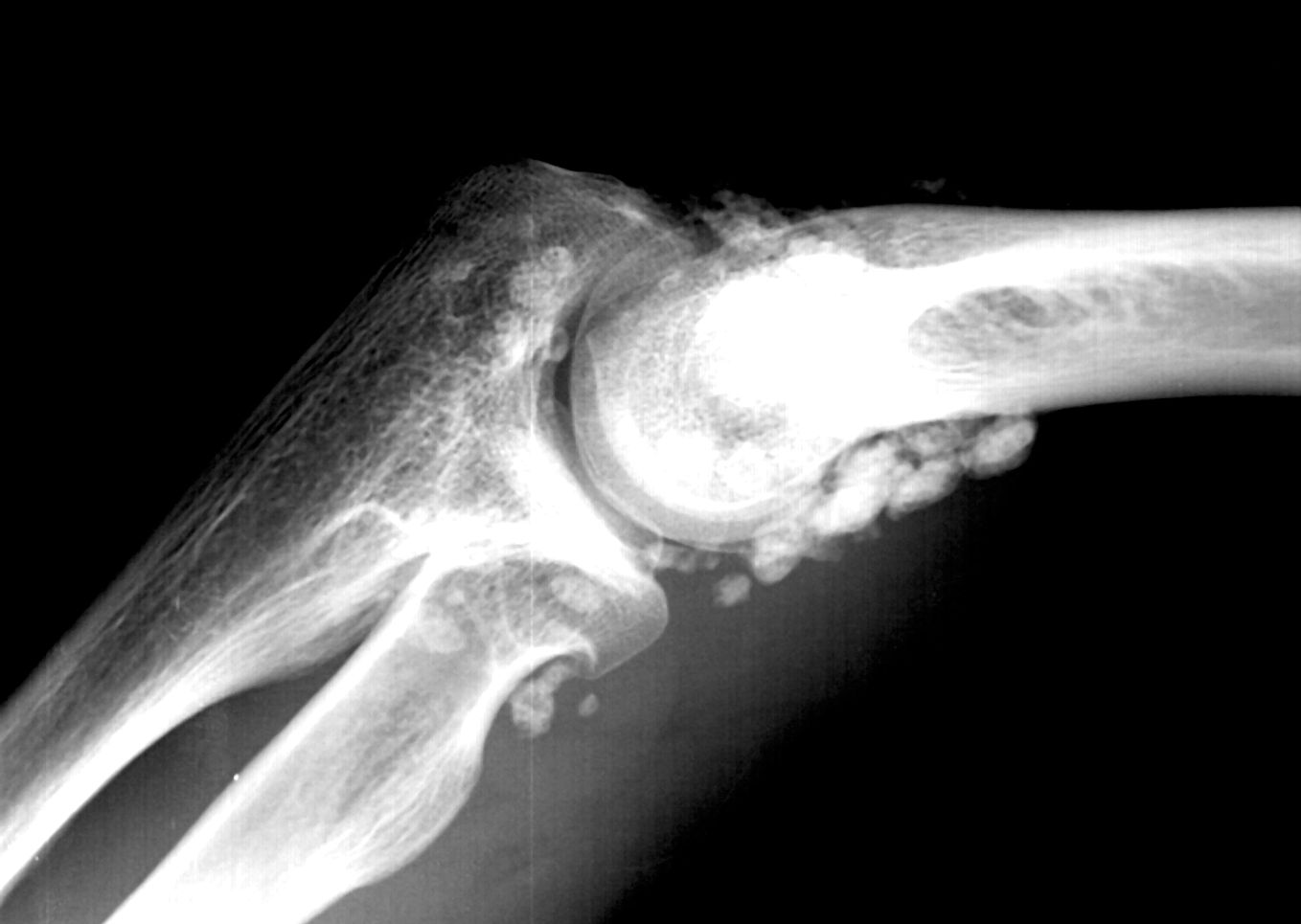
- X-ray of an elbow affected by synovial chondromatosis
- Specialty: Orthopedics

Synovial chondromatosis is a locally aggressive bone tumor of the cartilaginous type. It consists of several hyaline cartilaginous nodules and has the potential of becoming cancerous.

== Signs and symptoms ==
People usually complain of pain in one joint, which persists for months, or even years, does not ease with exercise, steroid injection or heat treatment, shows nothing on X-ray, but shows a definite restriction of movement.

There are 3 defined stages to this disease:

- early: no loose bodies but active synovial disease;
- transitional: active synovial disease, and loose bodies;
- late: loose bodies but no synovial disease;

In the early stages of the disease it is often confused with tendinosis and/or arthritis. Once it reaches transitional the loose bodies become apparent with X-ray in greater than 70% of cases, with MRI often showing where xray fails. In experienced hands, ultrasound is also useful for the diagnosis.

Rare and little known, with currently no known cure, the disease gradually forms blisters in the thin flexible membrane of the synovium, which calcify and enlarge. These nodules eventually break free and float around the joint space becoming larger – these add to the discomfort and stiffness of the joint. The affected tissue will show up as a semi-solid mass in an MRI scan, final diagnosis is usually confirmed by taking a biopsy. The disease generally affects only one of the larger weight bearing joints (hip, ankle, knee) – although the elbow, and wrist can also be affected. It rarely involves the temporomandibular joint (TMJ) and most publications are case reports.

Synovial chondromatosis occurs twice as commonly in males as females and usually in their forties. However, online communities for synovial chondromatosis patients have yielded a stark contrast, with equal representation from both genders and members diagnosed as young as late teenage/early 20s. Familial synovial chondromatosis with dwarfism introduces characteristics of dwarfism.

== Cause ==
The exact underlying cause of synovial chondromatosis is unknown. Some evidence suggests trauma may play a role in its development as it mainly presents in weight-bearing joints. Infection has also been considered as a contributing factor. The condition is not inherited.

Synovial chondromatosis can reportedly occur as either a primary or secondary form. Primary synovial chondromatosis, which is more rare, occurs spontaneously and does not appear to relate to any pre-existing conditions. Secondary synovial chondromatosis is the more common form and often occurs when there is pre-existent osteoarthritis, rheumatoid arthritis, osteonecrosis, osteochondritis dissecans, neuropathic osteoarthropathy (which often occurs in diabetic individuals), tuberculosis, or osteochondral fractures (torn cartilage covering the end of a bone in a joint) in the affected individual.

== Diagnosis ==
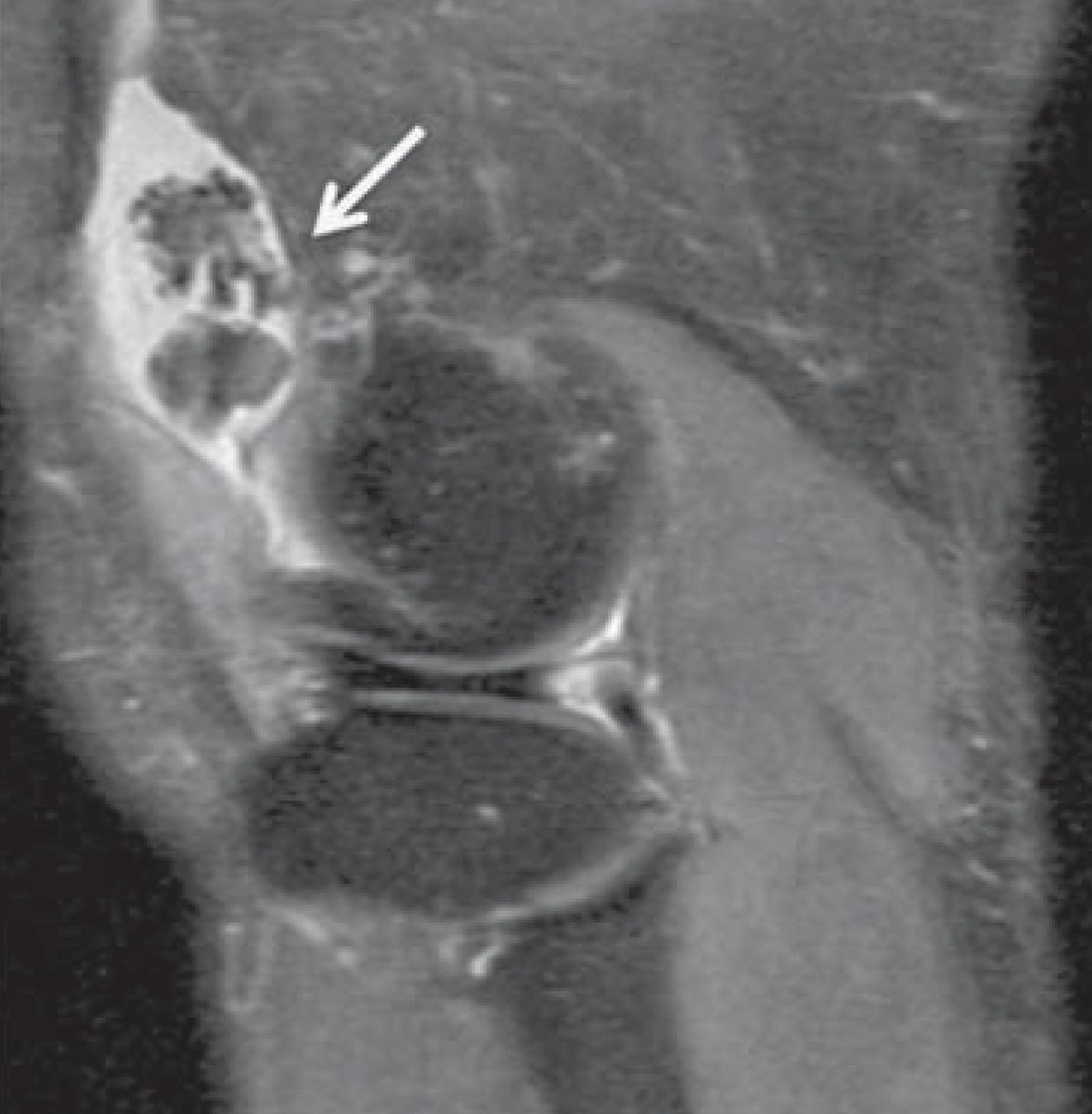
Proton density weighted MRI of a knee with synovial chondromatosis. There are multiple intra-articular loose bodies located in the suprapatellar recess.

Diagnosis is by medical imaging; X-ray, CT scan and MRI. For diagnosis of the TMJ, Cone beam computed tomography (CBCT) can also be useful.

== Treatment ==
Treatment is frequently by means of removal of the loose bodies and of a partial or full synovectomy (removal of the synovium)

Full synovectomy is a moderately major operation and involves completely exposing the joint and removing the affected tissue. Partial synovectomy is normally done arthroscopically. Synovectomies are normally carried out by shaving the lining of the knee but there are other ways of achieving this by either freezing the synovium or by the use of radiation treatment.

The need for further procedures is greater than 25% although normally the frequency of the required removal of loose bodies is reduced by the previous synovectomy. There have been documented cases of malignant transformation however this is rare.

Whilst the condition can be described as a ‘benign growth’ it seldom affects more than one joint, and does not usually affect surrounding tissue.

== Names ==
It is also known as Reichel's syndrome or Reichel-Jones-Henderson syndrome, named after Friedrich Paul Reichel, Hugh Toland Jones and Melvin Starkey Henderson.
