= Scoliosis Research Society =

International professional organization

SRS
- Scoliosis Research Society
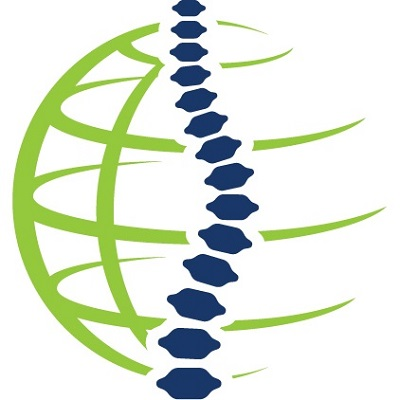
- Formation: 1966; 60 years ago
- Headquarters: 555 East Wells Street; Suite 1100; Milwaukee, WI 53202
- Location: United States
- Website: www.srs.org

The Scoliosis Research Society (SRS) is a non-profit, professional, international organization made up of physicians and allied health personnel, whose purpose is to "care for those with spinal deformity throughout life by patient care, education, research and patient advocacy." It was founded in 1966 with 37 members, and now has grown to include over 1300 spinal deformity surgeons and allied health personnel in 41 countries, with a primary focus on providing continuing medical education for health care professionals, and funding/support for research in spinal deformities. Among the founding members were Dr. Paul Randall Harrington, inventor of the Harrington rod treatment for scoliosis, and Dr. David B. Levine, spine surgeon at Hospital for Special Surgery. Harrington later served as president of the SRS from 1972 to 1973, and Levine was president of the society from 1978 to 1979. Current membership primarily includes spinal deformity surgeons, as well as some researchers, physician assistants, and orthotists who are involved in research and treatment of spinal deformities. Strict membership criteria ensure that the individual SRS Fellows are dedicated to the highest standards of care for adult and pediatric spinal deformities, utilizing both non-operative and operative techniques.

== Annual meeting ==
The organization holds an annual meeting with strong global participation from spine surgeons and specialists from around the world. This annual scientific meeting includes scientific presentations related to spine surgery and spinal deformity, which are selected through a process of abstract submission and peer review. Both basic science and clinical research are presented during the meeting and all clinical research (involving surgical treatment) is required to have a minimum of two-year post-operative follow-up.

== International Meeting on Advanced Spine Techniques ==
A second annual meeting, entitled International Meeting on Advanced Spine Techniques (IMAST) focuses on emerging technologies and techniques. This second meeting includes scientific presentations pertaining to all aspects of spinal surgery and treatment, not specifically relating to spinal deformity. Also, because the IMAST meeting does not require a minimum two-year post-operative patient follow-up for submitted research, the results of more recent surgical techniques can be presented for education and discussion.

== Courses and tutorials ==
A number of smaller instructional courses and tutorials are also held throughout the year, including regional and international meetings. Furthermore, as an organization dedicated to the study and treatment of spinal deformity, the SRS periodically releases position statements and holds symposia on various topics of interest, such as bracing, intraoperative neuromonitoring, and school scoliosis screening.

== Grants and funding ==
In the last fourteen years, SRS, in conjunction with OREF and the Cotrel Foundation, have provided more than $2.6 million for spinal deformity research projects.

== Website ==
The Scoliosis Research Society website serves as an educational resource to patients, and a professional resource for health care providers. For patients, a variety of spinal deformity topics and treatment options are explained in layman's terms and serve as a way for patients and their families to educate themselves about an otherwise complex medical condition.

The "Glossary" contains a comprehensive list of spinal terminology to help patients and their families make sense of the complex nomenclature and terms that are used in discussing spinal deformity. The "Find a Specialist" section offers patients access to an opted-in list of members of the Scoliosis Research Society, as well as their practice locations, contact information, and areas of expertise.

For healthcare professionals, the Scoliosis Research Society website contains educational materials, outcomes questionnaires, meeting schedules, and research opportunities. These educational materials are written and designed for personnel more familiar with medical terminology.
