= Risser sign =

Indirect measure of skeletal maturity

Pelvis
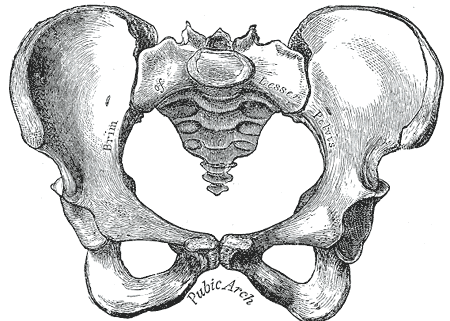
- Female pelvis

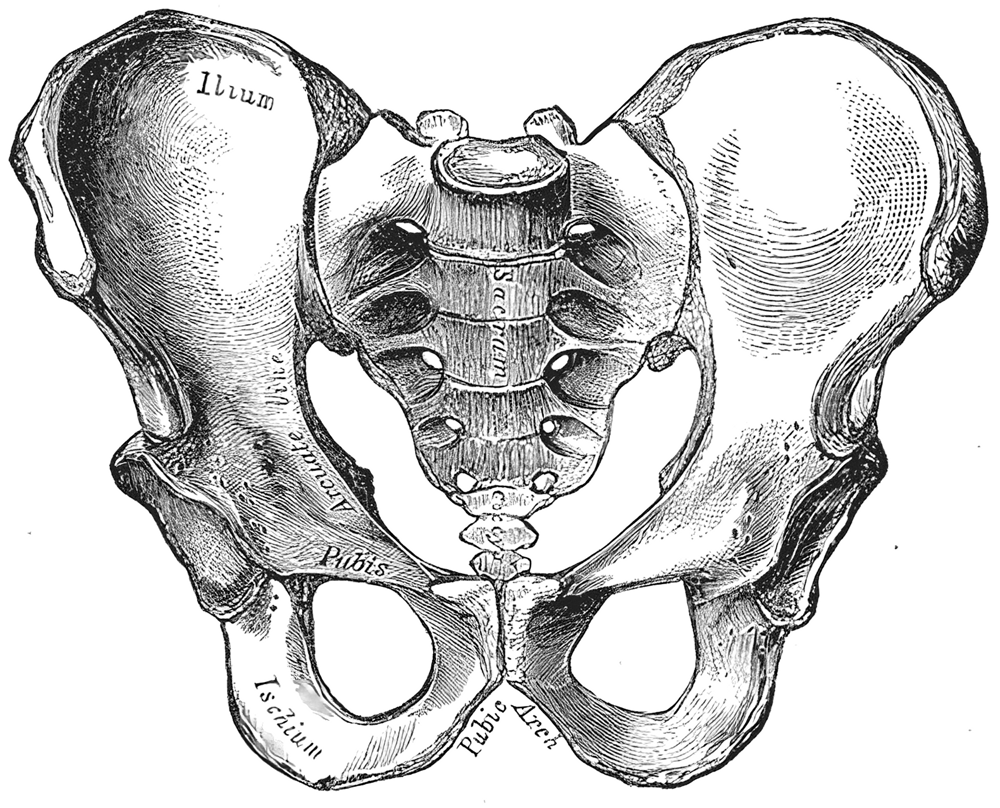
- Male pelvis

The Risser sign is an indirect measure of skeletal maturity, whereby the degree of ossification of the iliac apophysis by x-ray evaluation is used to judge overall skeletal development. Mineralization of the iliac apophyses begins at the anterolateral crest and progresses medially towards the spine. Fusion of the calcified apophyses to the ilium then progresses in opposite direction, from medial-to-lateral.

A typical five-point grading scale is as follows:

- Grade 1 is given when the ilium (bone) is calcified at a level of 25%; it corresponds to prepuberty or early puberty.
- Grade 2 is given when the ilium (bone) is calcified at a level of 50%; it corresponds to the stage before or during growth spurt.
- Grade 3 is given when the ilium (bone) is calcified at a level of 75%; it corresponds to the slowing of growth.
- Grade 4 is given when the ilium (bone) is calcified at a level of 100%; it corresponds to an almost cessation of growth.
- Grade 5 is given when the ilium (bone) is calcified at a level of 100% and the iliac apophysis is fused to iliac crest; it corresponds to the end of growth.

Risser grading is traditionally used to estimating the future growth potential of the adolescent spine, particularly in the setting of spinal scoliosis. Risser originally recognized that ossification of the iliac apophyses approximately parallels the ossification of the vertebral apophyses. The earlier the stage of growth, the greater the likelihood of a scoliosis progressing and potentially needing intervention. Note that although Risser first described his findings during a 1948 lecture and published the eponymous paper in 1958, formalized staging systems were developed at a later time.

== Controversy ==
The Risser grading system has been criticized as being an inaccurate proxy for skeletal maturity. Comparison of predicted future growth and progression of scoliosis to actual measured changes show that the Risser system is variably accurate. Specifically, because the progression from stages 1 to 4 (apophyseal "excursion") is rapid and only takes an average of approximately 1 year, these stages are of limited value in pinpointing stage of growth. Cessation of trunk growth as predicted by Risser stage is also earlier than actual growth.

In 2008, Sanders et al proposed an alternative system for assessing skeletal maturity, using hand x-rays in a manner similar to "gold standards" (Greulich and Pyle, Tanner-Whitehouse-III) skeletal maturity assessments. Whether the use of the Sanders vs Risser staging for management of scoliosis would lead to different treatment decisions is being debated.
