= Chitranjan Singh Ranawat =

American-Indian orthopedic surgeon (1935–2025)

- Born: 31March, 1934; Sarwaniya Maharaj, Neemuch, Madhya Pradesh, India
- Died: 26 September 2025 (aged 90–91)
- Occupation: Orthopedic surgeon
- Years active: since 1969
- Known for: development of joint replacement surgical techniques
- Awards: 2001 Padma Bhushan
- Website: official website

Chitranjan Singh Ranawat (1935 – 26 September 2025) was an American orthopedic surgeon of Indian origin.

Ranawat was born in Sarwania, in the Indian state of Madhya Pradesh and did his early medical education at Mahatma Gandhi Memorial Medical College, Indore and his schooling from The Daly College, Indore before moving to the US for advanced training. There, he worked at St. Peters Hospital, Albany and Albany Medical Center and received certification as an orthopedic surgeon by the American Board of Orthopedic Surgery in 1969. Later, he moved to Lenox Hill Hospital where he became the chairman and director of the Orthopedic department. He has also served as a professor at the Weill Medical College of Cornell University and as a visiting faculty at other universities. Ranawat and Albert Burstein of the Hospital for Special Surgery, also in New York City, invented a hip replacement implant marketed by Biomet.

In 1986 he founded the Ranawat Foundation, a philanthropic organization. and in 2001 he received the Padma Bhushan, the third highest Indian civilian award. Each year at its annual meeting, the Knee Society presents the "Chitranjan S. Ranawat, MD Award" and two other awards for the best research papers that year.

Ranawat died on 26 September 2025, at the age of 91.

== Writings ==
- Chitranjan S. Ranawat; Rock G. Positano (1999). Disorders of the Heel, Rearfoot, and Ankle. Churchill Livingstone. ISBN 978-0-443-07838-5.

== See also ==
- Joint replacement
- Arthroplasty
