= Hospital for Special Surgery =

Orthopedic hospital in New York City

Coordinates: 40°45′55″N 73°57′15″W

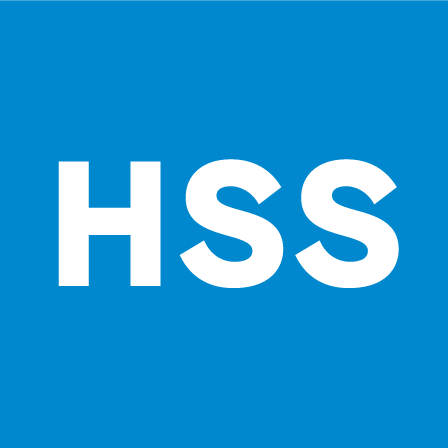

Geography
- Location: New York City, New York, United States

Organization
- Type: Specialist, teaching
- Affiliated university: Rockefeller University; Weill Cornell Medical College

Services
- Standards: Joint Commission
- Beds: 215

History
- Founded: 1863

Links
- Website: hss.edu
- Lists: Hospitals in New York State
- Other links: List of hospitals in Manhattan

Hospital for Special Surgery (HSS) is an academic medical center and research institution headquartered in New York City that specializes in the treatment of orthopedic and rheumatologic conditions. Its main campus is located at 535 East 70th Street in Manhattan and there are locations in New York, New Jersey, Connecticut, and Florida. The hospital was founded in 1863 by James Knight. HSS is the oldest orthopedic hospital in the United States and is consistently ranked as the world's top orthopedic hospital. Bryan T. Kelly served as the former surgeon-in-chief and currently serves as president and chief executive officer. Douglas E. Padgett serves as the current surgeon-in-chief.

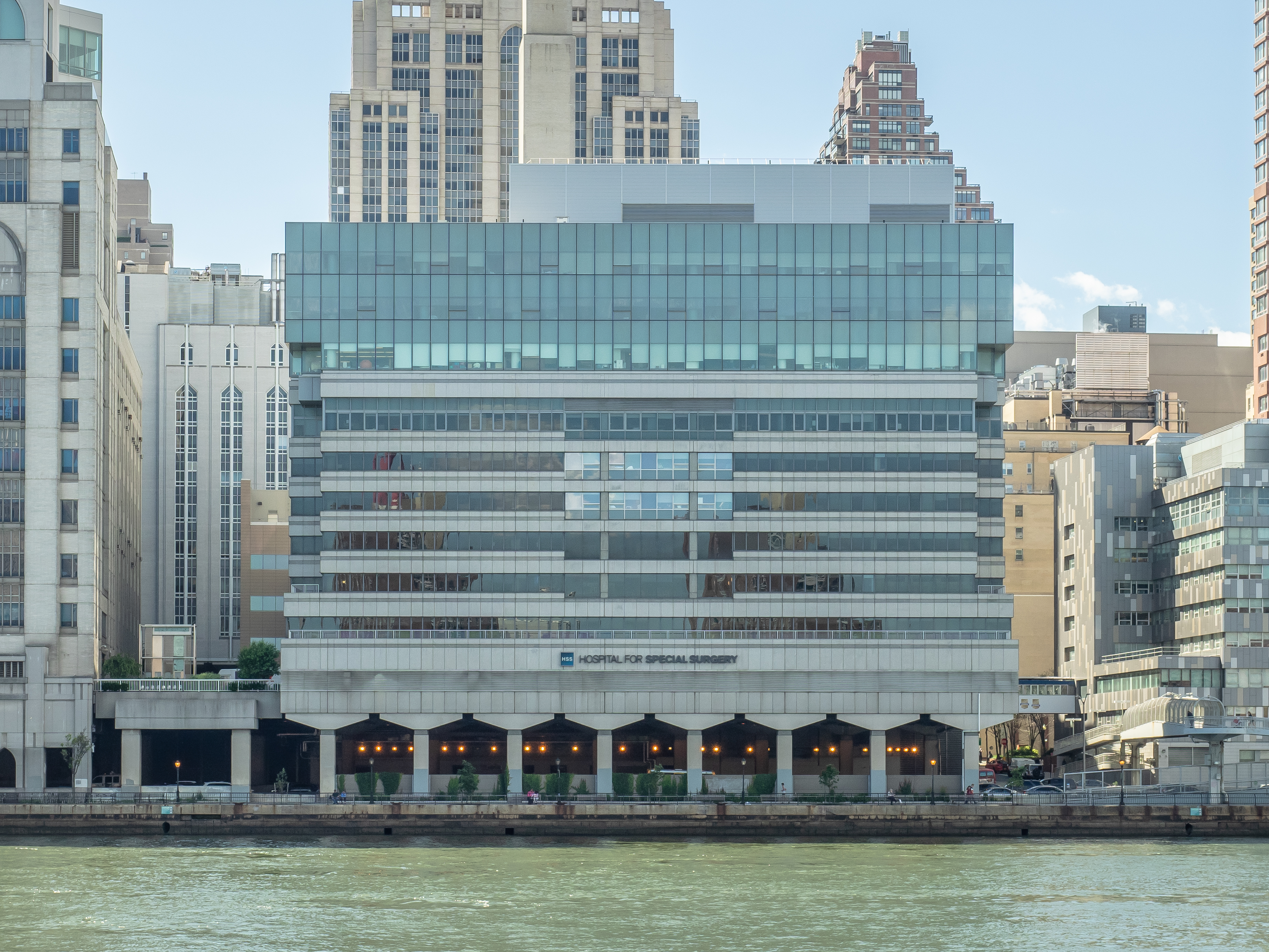
Hospital for Special Surgery

Areas of expertise at HSS include joint replacement, orthopedic trauma, hand and upper extremity surgery, limb lengthening, osseointegration, foot and ankle surgery, pediatric orthopedics, spine surgery, sports medicine, physiatry, rheumatology, and physical therapy. HSS Education Institute offers residency programs, fellowship programs, and professional medical education programs. The hospital has 453 active medical staff.

HSS is ranked first in orthopedics, worldwide, by Newsweek (2021–2025, 2027) and by U.S. News & World Report (2010–2027). HSS is also ranked third in rheumatology by U.S. News & World Report (2024–2027).

== History ==
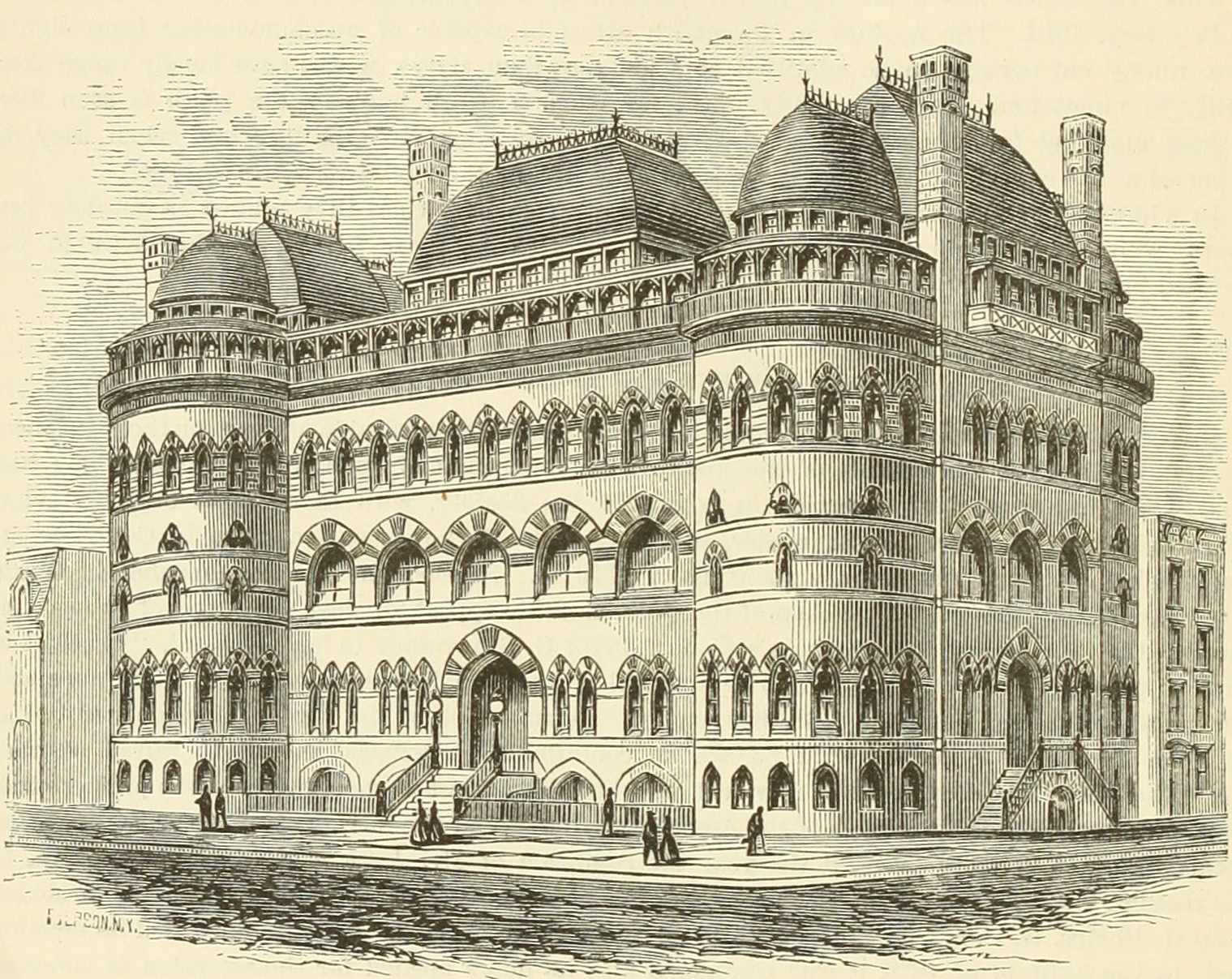
The Hospital for the Relief of the Ruptured and Crippled built in 1870, shown that year

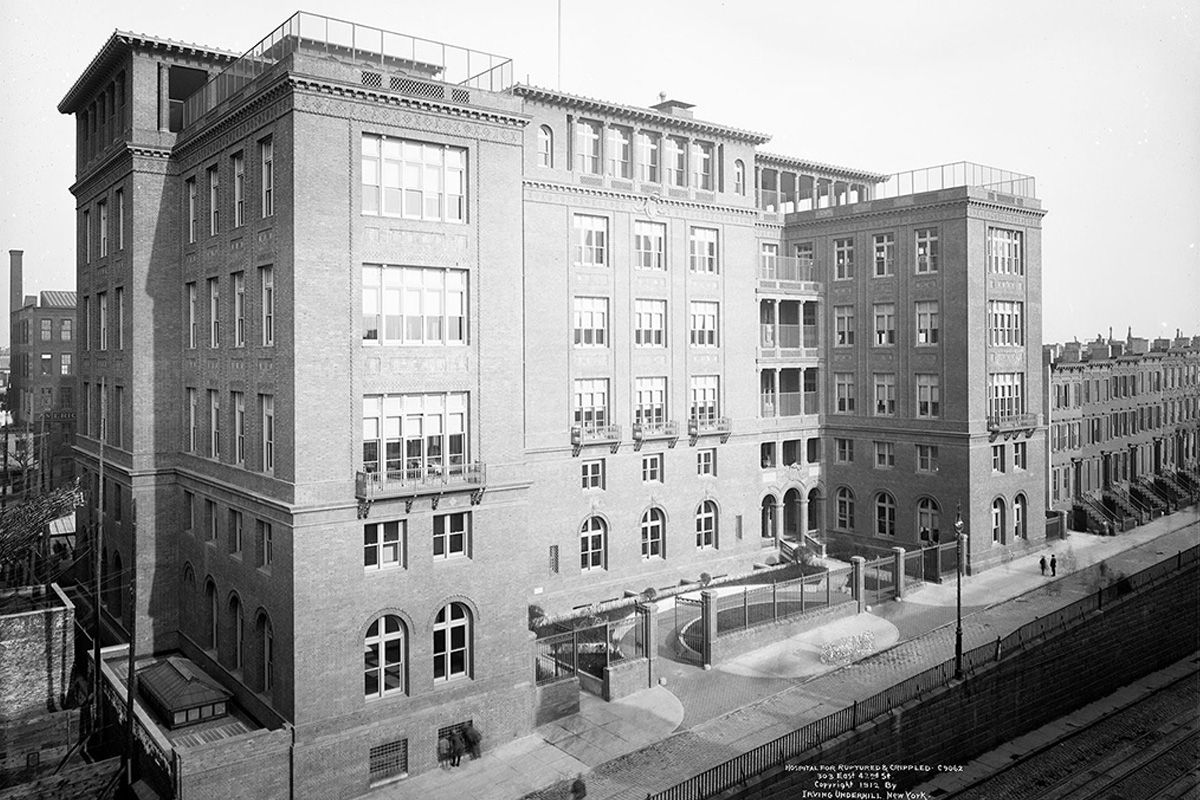
The 1912 building, at 321 East 42nd Street, between First and Second Avenues, shown the year it opened.

=== 1863–1899 ===
Hospital for Special Surgery was incorporated in New York City on March 27, 1863, as The Hospital of the New York Society for the Relief of the Ruptured and Crippled, by a group that included Dr. James Knight, a general practicing physician, and Robert M. Hartley, a secretary of the Association for Improving the Condition of the Poor. The hospital was founded as a philanthropic effort to provide medical care to injured Civil War soldiers and needy city residents. Dr. Knight was appointed Resident Physician and Surgeon. The hospital was located in the Manhattan home of Dr. Knight at 97 Second Avenue. There were 28 inpatient beds available for children and a conservatory to make braces. Adults were treated as outpatients. The poor were treated for free, and others were charged a moderate fee. The hospital opened its doors to the first patient, a four-year-old boy with paralysis, on May 1, 1863.

In 1870, the hospital moved to a 200-bed, four-story hospital built on the northwest corner of Lexington Avenue and 42nd Street (Manhattan). In 1871, Virgil P. Gibney joined the hospital as an assistant physician and surgeon. Gibney was appointed as the second surgeon-in-chief after Dr. James Knight's passing in 1887.

In 1887, the hospital founded the first orthopedic residency program in the country. Young doctors in training would apply for a one-year position as house surgeon, senior assistant, or junior assistant. They became known as residents, a term now universally recognized in the United States as a doctor in training.

The first dedicated operating room opened in 1898. In 1899, the hospital opened a pathology laboratory and installed the first X-ray machine four years after Wilhelm Röntgen invented the device.

=== 1900–1939 ===
In 1903, the hospital opened its first adult ward for female inpatients only. HSS became known as a national center for treating people affected by the polio epidemics. In 1901, Whitman developed an operation to stabilize polio survivors' paralyzed feet. The procedure afforded him and the hospital worldwide recognition. The hospital treated many polio patients during the 1907 and 1916 New York City polio epidemics. The State Charities Aid Association requested HSS to aid paraplegic patients throughout New York State. In 1912, the hospital moved to a six-story building on 42nd Street between First Avenue and Second Avenue, a site that is now the home of the Ford Foundation.

During World War I, the hospital opened its first male inpatient ward to treat injured sailors, marines, and soldiers. In 1924, Dr. R. Garfield Snyder was appointed as the first Physician-in-Chief and was handpicked by Gibney to lead the HSS rheumatology program, which he did from 1924 to 1944. Snyder published early therapeutic studies on Vitamin D, cinchophen, and gold compounds' effects on arthritis.

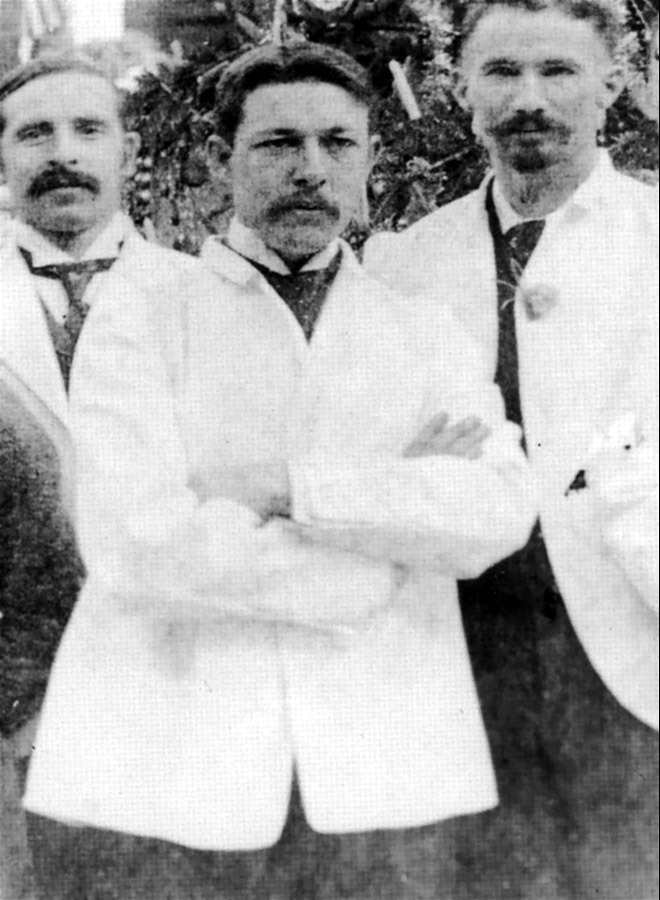
William Bradley Coley, Surgeon-in-Chief 1925–1933.

In the same year, the hospital established its first Department of Physiotherapy (later known as Physical Therapy). In 1925, the hospital opened its Occupational Therapy Department. In the same year, the hospital's Board of Managers appointed Dr. William B. Coley as the third Surgeon-in-Chief. It was the first time a general surgeon held the position at the hospital. With his mentor, Dr. William Bull, Coley advanced the surgical treatment of hernias at the hospital. Before the advent of surgical intervention, many adults and children became incapacitated by abdominal hernias, which could only be treated by braces and trusses. Bull and Coley's introduction of modern surgery eventually made the hospital the foremost hernia center in the country. Philip D. Wilson became Surgeon-in-Chief in 1935. Coley, as surgeon-in-chief emeritus, helped Wilson reorganize the Surgical Department. Under Wilson's leadership, the hospital became increasingly focused on musculoskeletal conditions.

=== 1940–1979 ===
In 1940, the hospital renamed the organization to the Hospital for Special Surgery (HSS). World War II significantly affected the staff, but patient care went uninterrupted. Many staff surgeons and doctors served overseas during the war. Residencies programs were temporarily reduced from two years to one year. The war effort demanded a greater number of orthopedic doctors and surgeons. Significant orthopedic advancements in fracture care, wound management, amputation surgery, and rehabilitation resulted from the battlefield experiences of HSS surgeons.

Dr. Richard Freyberg formalized the establishment of a rheumatic disease service at HSS and created fellowships in rheumatology. The hospital established one of the first bone banks in the United States in 1946.

In 1949, HSS became affiliated with New York Hospital-Cornell University Medical College. Under the agreement, HSS would provide orthopedic and rheumatological services for both organizations and subsequently eliminated the Department of General Surgery and other non-orthopedic surgical specialties.

The hospital moved to its present location of 535 East 70th Street in 1955. In the same year, Dr. Wilson stepped down as surgeon-in-chief and assumed the new title of Director of Research and Emeritus Surgeon-in-Chief. The hospital added the Alfred H. Caspary Research Building to its facilities in 1956.

Dr. T. Campbell Thompson became Surgeon-in-Chief in 1955. He is known for developing the Fracture Service at New York Hospital. The Margaret Caspary Research Building opened in 1960 and increased the hospital's capacity to 196.

In 1972, Dr. Philip D. Wilson Jr., MD, was appointed the eighth Surgeon-in-Chief of the Hospital, the same position held by his father thirty-seven years earlier. In 1974, Dr. Peter Walker, Dr. John Insall, Dr. Chitranjan Ranawat, and Dr. Alan Inglis performed the first successful total condylar knee replacement. The hospital also established its first sports medicine clinic and a biomechanics laboratory so surgeons and engineers could collaborate on improving prosthesis design. The clinic was established the same year that Congress passed the first Medical Device Regulation Act to collaborate with surgeons on device design, development, and the regulatory pathway for medical devices through the FDA.

=== 1980–2019 ===
In 1980, a major hospital expansion doubled the number of operating rooms from four to eight, with designated areas for performing total joint procedures. The expansion added the Belaire Building to its main campus. In 1987, the hospital added the Division of Pediatric Rheumatology. In 1988, HSS was designated a Multipurpose Arthritis and Musculoskeletal Diseases Center by the National Institutes of Health. Five years later, the NIH designated HSS as a Specialized Center of Research for the Study of Systemic Lupus Erythematosus. In 1989, the hospital opened a new facility on 73rd Street in Manhattan funded by the Dana Foundation, to house the biomechanics laboratory and to provide custom-made prosthetic limb and orthotics services.

In 1990, Dr. Andrew J. Weiland was appointed the ninth Surgeon-in-Chief. In 1991, HSS added two new ambulatory operating rooms and a 10-bed postoperative care unit. In the same year, the Department of Physiatry was established. The Barbara Volker Center for Women with Rheumatic Diseases was founded in 1997.

In 2000, HSS was awarded the first New York State Department of Health Patient Safety Award.

In 2015, the AIM Laboratory for Foot and Ankle Research was established. The laboratory is centered around a six-degrees-of-freedom robotic platform.

In 2016, surgeons and researchers from Hospital for Special Surgery developed the shortened Knee Injury and Osteoarthritis Outcome Score for Joint Replacement (KOOS, JR.) to create a faster patient survey for individuals undergoing total knee replacement.

In 2018, HSS piloted a telehealth rehabilitation program called HSS@Home for postoperative patients who underwent total knee or total hip arthroplasty.

During the COVID-19 pandemic, HSS served as an emergency room for all of NYC for people with injuries in order to prevent them from having to go to the usual emergency rooms, which were overwhelmed with COVID patients. HSS shut down all nonessential care during the pandemic and proactively volunteered to temporarily convert two ORs into Covid wards for a period of time, while also taking on non-COVID medical-surgical patients from neighboring Weill Cornell.

=== 2020-Present ===
HSS expanded HSS@Home across the entire hospital in 2020.

In 2021, HSS broke ground on a new 12-story building over FDR Drive at 71st Street, funded by a gift from the Anna-Maria and Stephen Kellen Foundation. HSS received Magnet Recognition for nursing excellence in 2002, 2007, 2011, 2016, and 2021.

In 2022, HSS spun out RightMove Health as a standalone telehealth physical therapy company.

In 2025, HSS and General Atlantic Partners acquired Legent Health.

HSS has ranked No. 1 in orthopedics nationally for 17 consecutive years (2010-2027), and ranked No. 3 in rheumatology by U.S. News & World Report in 2024–2027.

Bryan T. Kelly, MD was appointed President and CEO of HSS in 2023. Kelly is the hospital's first surgeon-in-chief to become CEO.

== About ==
=== Research ===
Hospital for Special Surgery research includes basic lab research, applied research, and clinical research. Basic and applied research at the hospital addresses conditions such as arthritis, orthopedic injury, scoliosis, osteoporosis, spinal disc degeneration, autoimmune diseases such as lupus, and related musculoskeletal diseases. HSS clinical research focuses on knee injuries, osteoarthritis, regenerative medicine, spine conditions, and rheumatologic conditions, such as lupus and scleroderma.

The HSS Journal is a peer-reviewed journal published since 2005. Submissions come from clinicians worldwide. The journal includes original research, review articles, and case reports on musculoskeletal conditions, diagnoses, and treatment. Articles are published online on a rolling basis and then four times per year in print. The HSS Journal is a Committee on Publication Ethics (COPE) member.

By 2024, HSS held 217 patents resulting from HSS research in bioengineering and other areas.

Suzanne Maher is the Chief Research Officer, and Lionel Ivashkiv is the Chief Scientific Officer.

=== Affiliations ===
Hospital for Special Surgery is affiliated with the New York-Presbyterian Healthcare System through its affiliation with Weill Cornell Medical College. All HSS medical staff are also faculty of Weill Cornell Medical College. The hospital is also affiliated with Memorial Sloan Kettering Cancer Center and Rockefeller University. HSS Rehabilitation National Network provides patients access to over 1,700 therapy providers across the United States.

HSS is affiliated with University of Miami Health System providing orthopedic and musculoskeletal care at UHealth SoLé Mia.

In 2006, the International Society of Orthopaedic Centers was founded at Hospital for Special Surgery. In 2022, the World Economic Forum selected Hospital for Special Surgery for the public-private coalition known as the Global Coalition for Value in Healthcare.

==== Sports affiliations ====
Hospital for Special Surgery is the official hospital and team of physicians to the New York Giants, the New York Knicks, the Brooklyn Nets, the New York Liberty, the New York Mets, the New York Rangers, the New York Red Bulls, Major League Pickleball, the Long Island Nets, the Westchester Knicks, the St. Lucie Mets, the Brooklyn Cyclones, Knicks Gaming, FC Monmouth, and the City University of New York Athletic Conference.

Hospital for Special Surgery serves as orthopedic consultants for US Youth Soccer, UFC, and the National Basketball Players Association.

Hospital for Special Surgery is the official hospital of the New York Road Runners and the TCS New York City Marathon.

Hospital for Special Surgery is designated as a Medical Center of Excellence by the Fédération Internationale de Football Association (FIFA). Hospital for Special Surgery is one of three hospitals in the United States to receive this distinction.

=== Facilities ===
Hospital for Special Surgery is headquartered on the Upper East Side of Manhattan, in New York City. Its main campus consists of 12 buildings, located between East 70th and East 80th Streets to the north and south and between FDR Drive and First Avenue to the east and west. The main inpatient hospital is located at 535 East 70th Street in Manhattan, New York and has 215 beds and 58 operating rooms.

In 2026, HSS opened Kellen Tower, connecting the main hospital with the HSS Pavillion.

The HSS Research Institute is centered at 515 East 71st Street in Manhattan, New York, where it also houses 20 wet labs. HSS orthopedic applied research occurs at the Center for Advanced Movement Technologies, at 510 East 73rd Street. HSS is building a 94,000-square-foot facility over the FDR Drive called the Anna-Maria and Stephen Kellen Tower that will adjoin two other buildings on its main campus. Other buildings on the campus include the Ambulatory Care Center, the Belaire Building, East River Place, East River Professional Building, The Pavilion, Parker House Sports Rehabilitation and Performance Center, River Terrace, and the 75th Street Campus housing Physiatry and Pain Management.

HSS has multiple outpatient locations and rehabilitation facilities throughout New York City, New York State, New Jersey, Connecticut, and Florida.

HSS operates HSS Stamford at the Chelsea Piers sports and recreational facility in Stamford, Connecticut. HSS doctors practice in Connecticut at four outpatient sites that are operated in collaboration with Stamford Health. HSS surgical teams perform surgeries at Stamford Hospital and Tully Health Center in Connecticut.

In Florida, HSS physicians see patients at HSS Florida outpatient locations in West Palm Beach, Wellington, and Naples. Surgeries are performed at the HSS Palm Beach ASC and the NCH North Naples Hospital in Florida.

== Notable alumni ==
Notable alumni include:

- Oheneba Boachie-Adjei, M.D., attending orthopedic surgeon, HSS
- John Robert Cobb, known for the Cobb angle, head of the Margaret Caspary scoliosis clinic, HSS
- John Insall, M.D., attending orthopedic surgeon, HSS
- David B. Levine, M.D., director of the Department of Orthopedic Surgery, HSS
- Paula J. Olsiewski, founder and director, Technology Development Office, HSS
- Leon Root, M.D., chief of pediatric orthopedics, HSS
- Francisco Valero-Cuevas, assistant scientist (biomechanical engineer), HSS
- Philip D. Wilson Jr., M.D., surgeon-in-chief 1972–1989
- Chitranjan Singh Ranawat, American orthopedic surgeon

== Notable faculty ==
=== Surgeons-in-chief ===
- 1863–1887 – James A. Knight
- 1887–1925 – Virgil P. Gibney
- 1925–1933 – William B. Coley
- 1933–1935 – Eugene H. Pool
- 1935–1955 – Philip D. Wilson
- 1955–1963 – T. Campbell Thompson
- 1963–1972 – Robert Lee Patterson, Jr.
- 1972–1990 – Philip D. Wilson Jr.
- 1990–1993 – Andrew J. Weiland
- 1993–2003 – Russell F. Warren
- 2003–2014 – Thomas P. Sculco
- 2014–2019 – Todd J. Albert
- 2019–2023 – Bryan T. Kelly
- 2023–present – Douglas E. Padgett

=== Physicians-in-chief ===
- 1924–1944 – R. Garfield Snyder
- 1944–1970 – Richard Freyberg
- 1970–1995 – Charles L. Christian
- 1995–2010 – Stephen A. Paget
- 2010–2020 – Mary K. Crow
- 2020–2025 – S. Louis Bridges, Jr.
- 2026–Present – Joel Press
