= American Association of Hip and Knee Surgeons =

Organisation involved in scholarly research

The American Association of Hip and Knee Surgeons (AAHKS) is a professional membership association focused on being the definitive global authorize on excellence in hip and knee care. It maintains a membership of over 5,000 board certified and fellowship trained joint replacement surgeons and healthcare professionals worldwide. The organization holds annual meetings, workshops, and seminars focusing on the latest in hip and knee orthopedic surgery to foster collaboration and knowledge sharing among its members.

== History ==
Established in 1991, AAHKS provides official position statements on clinical practice standards and regulatory issues, advocates for health policy issues pertaining to hip and knee surgery, provides practice resources for healthcare professionals, and provides opportunities for researchers in the field of hip and knee arthroplasty.

== Requirements ==
AAHKS fellow members are board-certified surgeons that perform at least 50 hip and/or knee replacement surgeries each year. These are fellowship trained adult reconstruction surgeons who spends at least one year of training beyond the required five years of orthopedic residency. They have completed the highest level of training for joint replacement surgery.
