= Philip D. Wilson Jr. =

American physician

Philip Duncan Wilson Jr.
- Born: February 14, 1920; Boston, Massachusetts, U.S
- Died: June 29, 2016 (aged 96)
- Occupation: Orthopedic surgeon

Philip Duncan Wilson Jr. (1920–2016) was an orthopedic surgeon who brought total hip replacement surgery to the Hospital for Special Surgery in 1967. He started at the Hospital for Special Surgery in 1948, and served as the Surgeon-in-Chief from 1972 to 1989. He served as the President of the American Academy of Orthopaedic Surgeons in 1972.

== Early life ==
Wilson was born in Boston, Massachusetts on February 14, 1920. He graduated from Harvard College in 1942 and Columbia University College of Physicians and Surgeons in 1944. He completed his residency at Massachusetts General Hospital, Hospital for Special Surgery and the University of California Medical Center. From 1946 to 1948, he served in the United States Army at Brooke General Hospital, attaining the rank of captain.

== Career ==
Wilson was an attending orthopedic surgeon at the New York Hospital and the Hospital for Special Surgery. At the same time, he was a professor of surgery at Cornell University Medical College. He subsequently served as the Surgeon-in-Chief of the Hospital for Special Surgery from 1972 to 1989, the same position his father, Philip D. Wilson Sr., held from 1935 to 1955. He led the Hospital for Special Surgery in the field of joint replacement and orthopedic research, fostering the hospital's development as a center for patient care. He introduced total hip replacement to the hospital in 1967 and served as the hospital's surgeon-in-chief from 1972 to 1989. He created a new approach to care in orthopedics by creating subspecialties based on anatomic regions. During his 17-year tenure as surgeon-in-chief, he developed a research department that brought together engineers and orthopedic surgeons and ushered biomechanics into the computer age. During this time, he held the dual role of Director of Resident Training, promoting innovation in graduate medical education and served as a role model for aspiring orthopedic surgeons.

During his career, Wilson treated patients such as the Reverend Billy Graham, New York Jets Quarterback Joe Namath, and both Fred and Mary Trump, the parents of Donald Trump.

== Death ==
Wilson died on June 29, 2016. He is buried at Doanes Point Cemetery in Sorrento, Hancock County, Maine.
