= American Board of Orthopaedic Surgery =

Medical non-profit organization

The American Board of Orthopaedic Surgery is an organization with the goal of establishing educational and professional standards for orthopedic residents and surgeons as well as evaluating the qualifications and competence of orthopedic surgeons. It is a member of the American Board of Medical Specialties.

== History ==
It was officially founded in 1934 after the American Orthopaedic Association (founded in 1887) charged a committee with establishing an organization with less stringent membership guidelines than the AOA. Borne from that committee was the American Academy of Orthopaedic Surgeons in 1933. The AOA charged a second committee with establishing an orthopedic specialty board. The eventual board – the American Board of Orthopaedic Surgery – consisted of representatives of the AOA, the AAOS and the orthopedic surgery section of the American Medical Association.
