= Cobb angle =

Measurement of scoliosis

89° Cobb angle measurement of a levoscoliosis

The Cobb angle is a measurement of bending disorders of the vertebral column such as scoliosis and traumatic deformities.

== Definition and method ==
It is defined as the greatest angle at a particular region of the vertebral column, when measured from the superior endplate of a superior vertebra to the inferior endplate of an inferior vertebra. However, the endplates are generally parallel for each vertebra, so not all sources include usage of a superior versus inferior endplate in the definition.

Unless otherwise specified it is generally presumed to refer to angles in the coronal plane, such as projectional radiography in posteroanterior view. In contrast, a sagittal Cobb angle is one measured in the sagittal plane such as on lateral radiographs.

Cobb angles are preferably measured while standing, since lying down decreases Cobb angles by around 7–10°.

== Uses ==
It is a common measurement of scoliosis.

The Cobb angle is also the preferred method of measuring post-traumatic kyphosis in a recent meta-analysis of traumatic spine fracture classifications.

== Severity ==
Severity	Cobb angle
Not scoliosis	<10°
Mild scoliosis	10–30°
Moderate scoliosis	30–45°
Severe scoliosis	>45°

Those with Cobb angle of more than 60° usually have respiratory complications.

Scoliosis cases with Cobb angles between 40 and 50 degrees at skeletal maturity progress at an average of 10 to 15 degrees during a normal lifetime. Cobb angles of more than 50 degrees at skeletal maturity progress at about 1 to 2 degrees per year.

== History ==
The Cobb angle is named after the American orthopedic surgeon John Robert Cobb (1903–1967). It was originally used to measure coronal plane deformity on radiographs with antero-posterior projection for the classification of scoliosis. It has subsequently been adapted to classify sagittal plane deformity, especially in the setting of traumatic thoracolumbar spine fractures.
