= American Academy of Orthopaedic Surgeons =

Orthopedic organization

AAOS
- American Academy of Orthopaedic Surgeons
- Formation: 1933; 93 years ago
- Headquarters: AAOS Building; 9400 West Higgins Road, Rosemont, Illinois, 60018-4976
- Location: United States
- Website: www.aaos.org

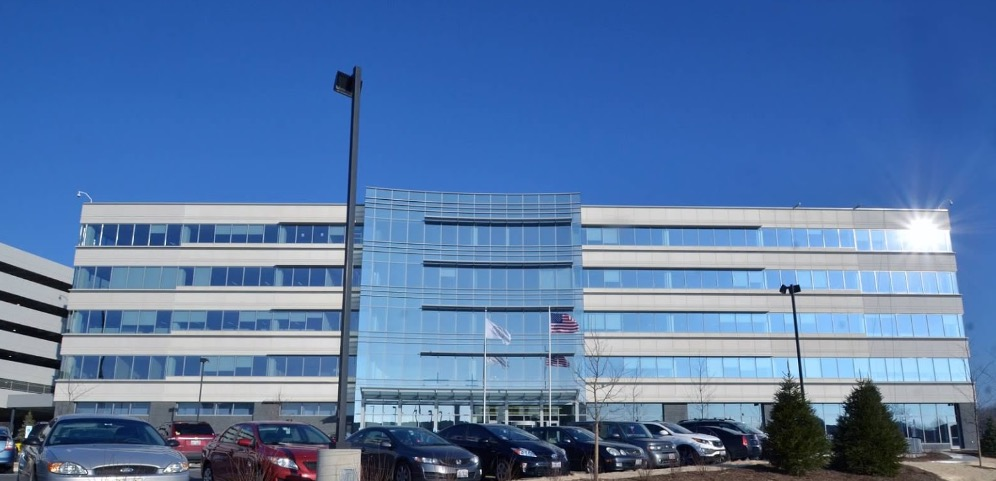
AAOS Building – Rosemont, IL

The American Academy of Orthopaedic Surgeons (AAOS) is an orthopedic organization. Founded at Northwestern University in 1933, as of 2015 AAOS had grown to include about 39,000 members. The group provides education and practice management services for orthopedic surgeons and allied health professionals. It also lobbies and works on public education. It describes itself as "the world's largest medical association of musculoskeletal specialists." It is a provider of musculoskeletal education to orthopaedic surgeons and others. Its continuing medical education activities include an annual meeting, multiple CME courses held around the country and at the Orthopaedic Learning Center, and various medical and scientific publications and electronic media materials.

== AAOS Now ==
Monthly nonpeer-reviewed news magazine published by the AAOS.

== Notable people ==
- Philip D. Wilson Jr. – president, 1972
- Joseph A. Bosco III, MD, FAAOS - president, 2020
