= Copenhagen disease =

Childhood spinal disorder

- Other names: Progressive non-infectious anterior vertebral fusion, Copenhagen syndrome
- Specialty: Orthopedic
- Causes: Unknown
- Diagnostic method: X-ray, MRI

Copenhagen disease, sometimes known as Copenhagen syndrome or progressive non-infectious anterior vertebral fusion (PAVF), is a very rare spinal disorder of unknown cause, with distinctive radiological features. It is characterized by the progressive fusion of the anterior vertebral body in the thoracolumbar region of the spine.

It was first identified in 1949 and 80–100 reported cases since, 60% of which were female. Due to the disease's rarity, research into this condition has been limited.

Copenhagen disease is known as such because the majority of cases were found at Copenhagen University Hospital.

== Pathophysiology ==
The initial stages of Copenhagen disease closely resemble Scheuermann's disease, where a disturbance in the zone of growth of the vertebral bodies leads to a wedged-shaped deformation in the spine. However, the deformity in the vertebrae in Copenhagen's disease progresses differently than in Scheuermann's disease. In Copenhagen disease, there is a narrowing of the anterior wall of the intervertebral disc with adjacent end plate erosions. The narrowing progresses until the disc space is eliminated, resulting in bony ankylosis, or stiffness in the joints, and eventually fusion of the anterior vertebral body. In Scheuermann's disease, however, it is very rare for adults to develop ankylosis in their adult life.

== Presentation ==
Most cases of Copenhagen disease have been reported in Europe only.

Copenhagen disease is often an asymptomatic condition, and is more commonly identified as an incidental medical finding. Some cases may present with symptoms including back pain, difficulty walking, stiffness of the neck and back, or kyphosis. Complete bony ankylosis occurs as the disease progresses over the years. Multiple congenital spine defects such as osteogenesis imperfecta may accompany Copenhagen disease.

Radiological findings may show anterior erosion and irregularity in the vertebral endplates, related to the narrowing of the space between vertebrae in specific areas. This is followed by spinal fusion which is not typically seen in the posterior disc space except in later stages of the disease.

The following signs and symptoms have been reported in the literature:

Common symptoms	Less common symptoms
Abnormality of the intervertebral disk; Abnormality of the vertebral column; Brachycephaly; Depressed nasal bridge; Downslanted palpebral fissures; Flat face; Hemivertebrae; Hypertelorism; Kyphosis; Large hands; Lordosis; Micrognathia; Round face; Scoliosis; Short philtrum; Thickened skin; Thin vermilion border; Wide mouth; Wide nasal bridge	Abdominal situs inversus; Abnormal facial shape; Bone pain; Exostoses; Joint stiffness; Morphological abnormality of the central nervous system; Proximal radio-ulnar synostosis; Spinal rigidity; Tall stature

== Diagnosis ==
MRI (preferentially) and thoracolumbar spinal X-rays are used to confirm a diagnosis of Copenhagen disease, in order to visualize the extent of the intervertebral ankylosis and identify prominent features. Radiographs collected soon after birth are used for diagnosis, as early detection leads to improved intervention and management.

CT scans may also be used to visualise the vertebrae, but this technique currently lacks support from the literature. 3D-CT scans can be utilized to clarify the extent of the vertebral malformations and assist in differential diagnosis.

== Treatment ==
Treatment options include spinal bracing, surgical options, and chronic pain management. Regular clinical check-ups and close orthopedic supervision is crucial to avoid sagittal imbalance. Both lordosis and kyphosis should be treated accordingly, most often via surgical correction, physical therapy, and anti-inflammatory medications.

Malagelada et al. found that functional scores and symptom presentations did not significantly differ depending on operative or non-operative treatments. However, the treatment selection can affect progression of kyphosis. There is also limited information on effectiveness and types of bracing, and further data is needed regarding clinician guidelines.

== Prognosis ==
Copenhagen disease by itself, while progressive in nature, is not considered life-limiting or significantly disabling. However, low back pain is fairly common among individuals with this disease, who may also have to live with some form of kyphosis and its associated complications. Through adolescence and adulthood, the typical anterior fusion of the thoracolumbar vertebrae progresses until fusion is complete. After this takes place, progression stabilizes and symptoms are gradually reduced. There are few case reports of long-term follow-up with longitudinal imaging.
