= Pott's disease =

Tuberculosis of the spine

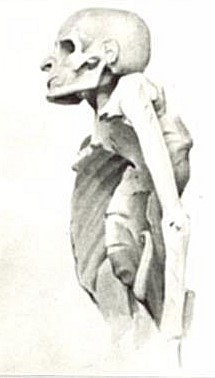
- Tuberculosis of the spine in an Egyptian mummy
- Specialty: Rheumatology
- Symptoms: Pott's spine, tuberculous spondylitis, spinal tuberculosis
- Diagnostic method: Radiograph, Bone scan, MRI
- Named after: Percivall Pott

Pott's disease (also known as tuberculous spondylitis) is tuberculosis of the spine, usually due to hematogenous spread from other sites, often the lungs. The lower thoracic and upper lumbar vertebrae areas of the spine are most often affected. It was named for British surgeon Percivall Pott, who first described the symptoms in 1779.

It causes a kind of tuberculous arthritis of the intervertebral joints. The infection can spread from two adjacent vertebrae into the adjoining intervertebral disc space. If only one vertebra is affected, the disc is normal, but if two are involved, the disc, which is avascular, cannot receive nutrients, and collapses. In a process called caseous necrosis, the disc tissue dies, leading to vertebral narrowing and eventually to vertebral collapse and spinal damage. A dry soft-tissue mass often forms and superinfection is rare.

Spread of infection from the lumbar vertebrae to the psoas muscle, causing abscesses, is not uncommon.

== Diagnosis ==
The most common and earliest clinical symptom of Pott's disease is back pain, often associated with local tenderness, worsening muscle spasms along the spine, and focal edema. These symptoms can lead to limited and painful movement in all directions of the spine.

The second most common clinical symptom is neurological deficits, which can vary depending on the level of the spine affected. An infection in the neck area can cause nerve problems affecting both the arms and legs, while an infection in the lower back typically affects only the legs and the area around the tailbone.

In the early stages of Pott's disease, imaging techniques such as computed tomography (CT), magnetic resonance imaging (MRI), or traditional radiography are utilized. For a radiolucent lesion to appear on a plain X-ray, there must be a 30% loss of bone mineral, making it difficult to diagnose the early stages of Pott's disease with a plain radiograph. CT scans are often used as a guide for biopsies. Overall, it is widely documented that MRI is superior to plain radiographs in diagnosing Pott's disease.

Initial suspicion of Pott's disease is usually based on clinical symptoms and imaging findings, but a definitive diagnosis requires isolating the organism by culture, identifying it, and determining its drug susceptibility. The typical lab procedure for clinical specimens involves an AFB (acid-fast bacilli) stain.

The ESR (erythrocyte sedimentation rate) and CRP (C-reactive protein) are also used as biomarkers for spinal tuberculosis.

Other labs include:

- Blood tests
  - Complete blood count: leukocytosis
  - Elevated erythrocyte sedimentation rate: >100 mm/h
- Tuberculin skin test
  - Tuberculin skin test (purified protein derivative [PPD]) results are positive in 84–95% of patients with Pott disease who are not infected with HIV.

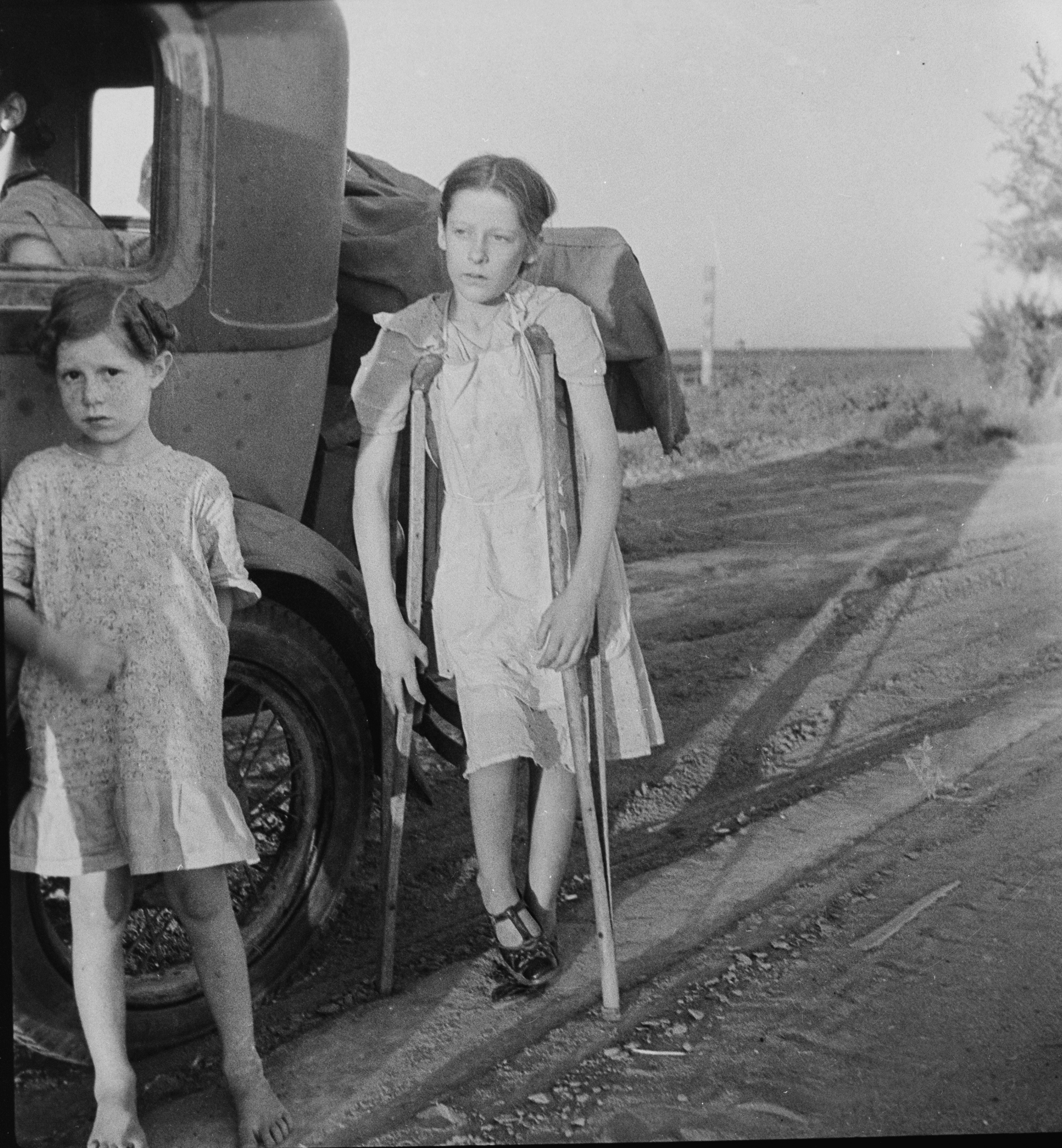
A girl from Oklahoma, who has been affected by bone tuberculosis, 1935

- Radiographs of the spine
  - Radiographic changes associated with Pott disease present relatively late. These radiographic changes are characteristic of spinal tuberculosis on plain radiography:

1. Lytic destruction of anterior portion of vertebral body
2. Increased anterior wedging
3. Collapse of vertebral body
4. Reactive sclerosis on a progressive lytic process
5. Enlarged psoas shadow with or without calcification
- Additional radiographic findings may include:
1. Vertebral end plates are osteoporotic
2. Intervertebral disks may be shrunken or destroyed
3. Vertebral bodies show variable degrees of destruction
4. Fusiform paravertebral shadows suggest abscess formation
5. Bone lesions may occur at more than one level

- Bone scan
- Computed tomography of the spine
- Bone biopsy
- MRI

== Clinical presentation ==
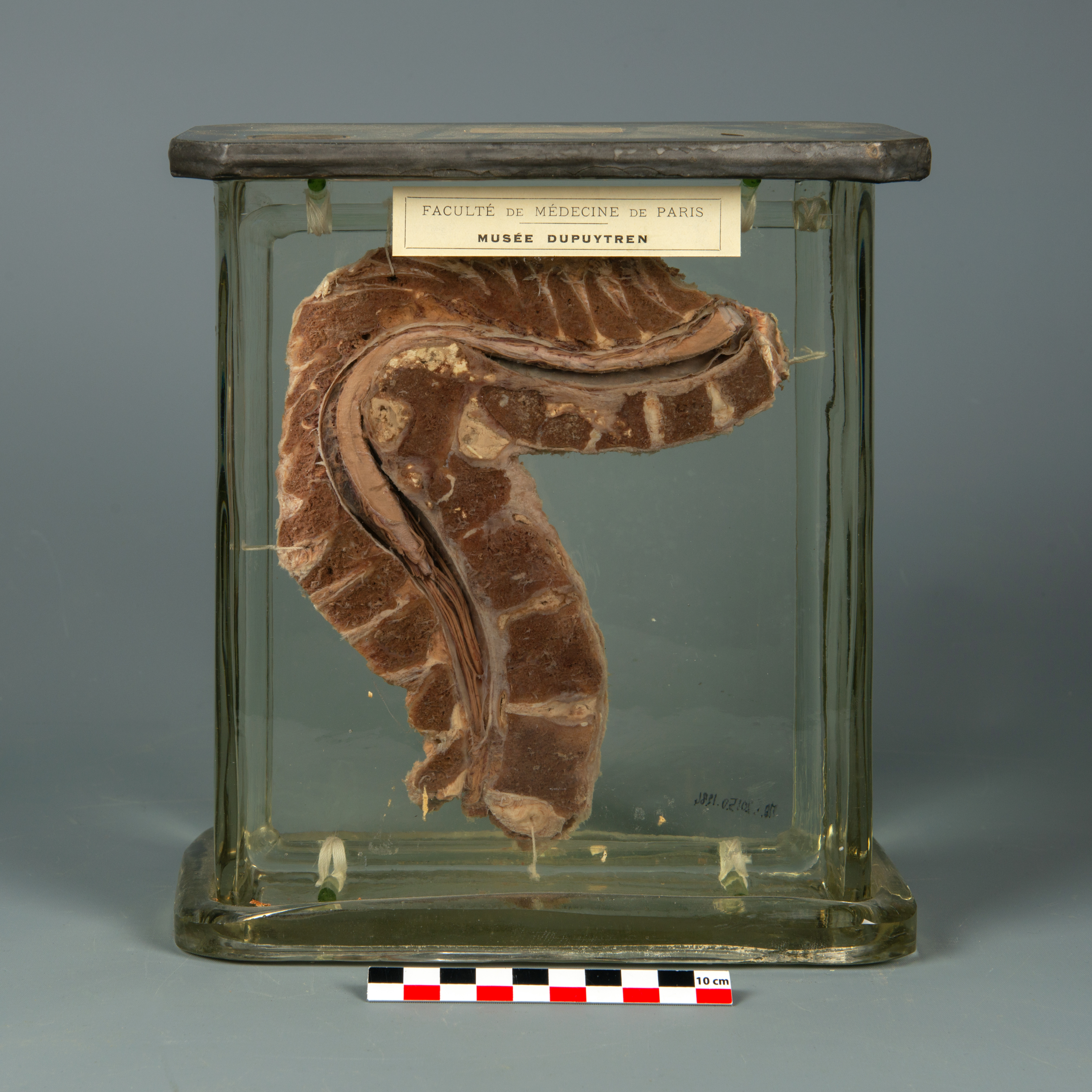
Portion of the spine affected by Pott's disease (Sorbonne University).

The onset of symptoms is gradual and disease progresses slowly. The duration of symptoms before diagnosis ranges from 2 weeks to several years, The average period was at least 12 months, but it has recently decreased to 3 and 6 months. Presentation depends on disease stage, location, and complications such as neurological deficits and abscesses.

Non-spinal symptoms include weakness, loss of appetite, weight loss, evening fever, and night sweats. Clinical findings include back pain, paraparesis, kyphosis, sensory disturbances, and bowel and bladder dysfunction. Signs of associated extraskeletal tuberculosis include cough, expectoration, swollen lymp nodes, diarrhea, and abdominal swelling.

The earliest and most common symptom is back pain, which worsens with activity. Muscles relax when asleep which causes pain. As the infection progresses, the pain becomes more severe leading to para-spinal muscle spasms. The spasms cause all spinal movements to be restricted and painful.

The second most common symptom is neurological deficits which depends on the location of the infection. If the cervical spine is affected, upper and lower extremities will show signs of dysfunction. If the infection is in the lumbar, deficits are localized to the lower extremities and sacral area. These neurological symptoms are caused by direct pressure on nerves, invasion of neural tissue, tuberculous meningitis, dislocation or subluxation of vertebrae, or reduced blood flow to the spinal cord. Deficits progress from the front to the back, thus affecting the front of the spinal tract first. It heightens reflex and upper motor neuron deficit causing it to eventually advance to limb weakness and difficulty walking due to muscle spasms.

Pott's disease presents in children more frequently due to the increased vascularization of their spine. It also presents with back pain, neurological deficits, cold abscesses, and kyphosis deformities. In children, kyphosis is not limited to the disease being active, instead it increases or worsens in periods of growth, which further exacerbates other symptoms.

Certain presentations can cause abscesses to form, which puts the patient at a higher risk of spinal cord damage and possible paraplegia. The lesions responsible for abscesses occur more frequently in younger patients as their spine is highly vascularized compared to adults. Involvement of the front part of the spine or areas not involving the bone initially spares it and the disc of the spinal column. However, abscess formation allows disease to spread over multiple contiguous vertebrae using the front longitudinal ligament. These abscesses are granulomatous and, as they expand, lift the periosteum leading to bone devascularization, necrosis, and eventually deformity. Rear involvement follows a similar process but uses the longitudinal ligament in the back and often affects the neural arch. Paradiscal, central, and non-bone lesions account for 98% of all spinal TB cases, indicating that lesions originating in the back are much more rare.

Cold abscesses develop near lesions, and they are called 'cold' because they lack typical inflammatory signs like warmth and redness. They can grow significantly large which worsens the patient's symptoms. For example, if the primary lesion is located in the cervical spine, a cold abscess could form in the area behind the pharynx causing symptoms such as difficulty swallowing, breathing issues, or a hoarse voice.

== Pathogenesis ==
Infection of the lungs by the bacteria Mycobacterium tuberculosis (MTB) eventually spreads through the host's body. Without treatment and diagnosis, the infection becomes dormant in the lungs or spreads to other parts of the body through hematogenous dissemination.

When dissemination occurs, MTB enters the cancellous or spongy bone of the vertebra through the vascular system. It travels specifically from the front and back spinal arteries, and pressures within the torso spreads the infection throughout the vertebral body.

It impacts the front of the vertebral body along the subchondral plate. As it advances, progressive destruction occurs leading to vertebral collapse and kyphosis. The spinal canal may become narrowed due to abscesses, granulation tissue, or direct dural invasion resulting in compression of cord and neurological deficits. Kyphosis is a result of the front of the spine collapsing. Injury to the thoracic spine are more likely to result in kyphosis compared to lumbar spine injuries. A cold abscess can develop if infection spreads to ligaments and soft tissues. In the lower back, there is a chance the abscess can move down along the psoas muscle to the upper thigh and eventually break through the skin.

== Transmission ==
MTB is contracted and spread through aerosol droplets. Respiratory MTB or tuberculosis (TB) have been documented in patients that have negative results for specific cultures. The sum of two cases concluded that about 17% of transmission occurs from patients who have negative results. Another study concluded that TB infection outside the lungs increased the transmission rate, which has always been overlooked.

== Risk factors ==
Some known risk factors for Pott's disease include immunodeficiencies (such as those caused by alcohol and drug abuse or HIV), exposure to infected patients, poverty, undernourishment, and lower socioeconomic status.

HIV has been identified as one of the primary risk factors for the development of Pott's disease and this is because HIV compromises the immune system by attacking and destroying crucial immune cells, thereby weakening the body's natural defenses. This impairment significantly reduces the body's ability to combat infections, including tuberculosis (TB), making it more difficult for the body to fight off TB germs effectively. In regions like Sub-Saharan Africa, where the disease is prevalent, HIV often coexists with spinal TB, significantly complicating management and diagnosis. Data collected in New York and Los Angeles shows that this disease primarily affects foreign-born individuals, African Americans, Asian Americans, and Hispanic Americans.

Vitamin D deficiency has also been correlated with an increased risk of Pott's disease, particularly spinal TB with caseous necrosis, increasing the risk of necrosis compared to individuals with normal vitamin D levels. A deficiency in vitamin D has been associated with the activation of tuberculosis (TB) for a long time. TB patients typically have lower serum vitamin D levels compared to healthy individuals. Extended TB treatment also leads to a reduction in serum vitamin D levels. Research has indicated that vitamin D plays a crucial role in modulating innate immune responses, acting as a cofactor in the induction of antimycobacterial activity.

In developed countries like the United States, Pott's disease is primarily found in adults. However, in developing countries, data shows that Pott's disease occurs mainly in young adults and older children. Crowded and poorly ventilated living and working conditions, which are often linked to poverty, significantly increase the risk of tuberculosis transmission. Undernutrition is another crucial factor that raises the likelihood of developing active TB. Additionally, poverty correlates with limited health knowledge and a lack of empowerment to utilize that knowledge, which results in greater exposure to various TB risk factors, including HIV, smoking, and alcohol abuse.

== Epidemiology ==
About 2% of all cases of tuberculosis are considered Pott's disease and about half (50%) of the cases of musculoskeletal tuberculosis are Pott's disease, of which 98% affect the anterior column. The disease can be attributed to 1.3 million deaths per year. There is a correlation between tuberculosis infections and cases of Pott's disease, as it's prevalent in areas where tuberculosis infections are common. Known risk factors like lower socioeconomic status, overcrowding, immunodeficiency, and interactions with people with tuberculosis can influence the rate of diagnosis.

Underdeveloped countries have a higher incidence rate of Pott's disease as it is associated with less ventilated rooms, crowded spaces, poorer hygiene, and less access to healthcare facilities. Increasing food security, reducing poverty, and improving living and working conditions will help to prevent infection and generally enhance the care of those sick.

Tuberculosis affecting bones and joints (osteoarticular TB) accounts for approximately 1% to 15% of cases of extrapulmonary TB, with between 50% to 70% of osteoarticular TB being Pott's disease. Children account for about 50% of Pott's cases, still any age group is at risk for developing the disease. Individuals who have used immunosuppressants, have compromised immune systems, have chronic diseases like diabetes, or who use tobacco, have a significantly increased risk of becoming ill with tuberculosis infections. In older populations, the disease is often misdiagnosed, often being disregarded for other degenerative diseases. Children's spines contain more cartilage, increasing the effect of spinal deformations caused by the disease, making the disease more problematic in children.

Multidrug resistant tuberculosis poses a threat to people with Pott's disease, making it difficult to determine infection in people because of the paucibacillary symptoms of the disease. Cases of tuberculosis have been on the decline; however, infections of multidrug resistant tuberculosis have remained constant since the 1990s, and cases of extensively drug‐resistant TB have been on the rise since the mid-2000s.

== Prevention ==
As one type of tuberculosis infections, individuals can't entirely prevent Pott's disease, but they are able to take steps to reduce the risk of TB (tuberculosis) infection by avoiding prolonged, close contact with someone who has an active TB (tuberculosis) infection and getting tested regularly for TB (tuberculosis) if they're at higher risk or live in a region where TB (tuberculosis) is common.

Controlling the spread of tuberculosis infection can prevent tuberculous spondylitis and arthritis. Patients who have a positive PPD test (but not active tuberculosis) may decrease their risk by properly taking medicines to prevent tuberculosis. To effectively treat tuberculosis, patients must take their medications exactly as prescribed.

== Management ==
Guidelines from the WHO, CDC, and American Thoracic Society state that antibiotics are the first-line treatment for Pott's disease. Surgical intervention may be appropriate for some patients. With early intervention, Pott's disease can be cured and completely eradicated from the patient. Drug-resistant tuberculosis may lead to poorer or possibly life-threatening outcomes in children, the elderly, and immunocompromised patients. Rehabilitation for patients who have just undergone surgery or are recovering from Pott's disease often consist of analgesics for pain management, immobilization of the affected spinal region, and physical therapy for pain-relieving modalities.

=== Antibiotic Therapy ===
The treatment prescribed to patients diagnosed with Pott's disease is similar to treatment that is generally given to patients who have other forms of extrapulmonary tuberculosis. According to guidelines, typical treatment begins with a six to nine month course of antibiotics. The regimen usually consists of an initial 2-month intensive phase of Isoniazid (INH), Rifampin (RIF), Pyrazinamide (PZA), and Ethambutol (EMB). Following the 2-month initial phase, PZA and EMB are discontinued while INH and RIF are continued for the remaining four to seven month continuation phase of the treatment period.

Some practices, however, have recommended treatment regimens of over 12 months given the mortality and disability risks associated with failure to completely eradicate the disease, and the difficulty in assessing the effectiveness of treatment.

=== Surgical intervention ===
Surgical intervention is required for patients with Pott's disease in the event that there is a need for tissue sampling to clarify diagnoses, resistance to chemotherapy (often found in patients with HIV), neurologic deficits (including but not limited to abnormal reflexes, problems with speech, decreased sensation, loss of balance, decreased mental function, vision/hearing problems, and paraplegia), paravertebral abscesses formed from bacterial induced immune response, and kyphotic deformities leading to instability of the spine. However, surgery is up to shared clinical decision making and not an intervention that is defaulted to, as guidelines tend to lead towards less invasive procedures such as chemotherapy and anti-tuberculosis medications.

Typical surgical techniques used are as follows:

- Posterior decompression and fusion with bone autografts
- Anterior debridement/decompression and fusion with bone autografts
- Anterior debridement/decompression and fusion followed by simultaneous or sequential posterior fusion with instrumentation
- Posterior fusion with instrumentation followed by simultaneous or sequential anterior debridement/decompression and fusion

==== Posterior decompression and fusion ====
In posterior decompression and fusion with bone autografts, the goal is to relieve pressure on the spinal cord and nerves in the lower back and prevent the progression of kyphosis in active disease. In this procedure, the lumbar (lower back) vertebrae (L1-L5) are exposed and the intervertebral discs and vertebral material impinging on the spinal cord and/or nerves are removed. The vertebrae (typically L4-L5 due to their load bearing nature and vulnerability to degradation) are then fused together with grafts or instrumentation to help provide more support to the back and spine of the patient.

==== Anterior debridement/Decompression and fusion ====
The goal of the anterior debridement/decompression and fusion with bone autografts procedure is to relieve pressure on the spinal cord and nerves along the anterior side of the spinal cord and help prevent the progression of kyphosis in active disease. The anterior approach is often recommended instead of the posterior approach in cases where only single segments of the vertebrae are affected, and in the event that there is no destruction or collapse of the posterior elements. In anterior debridement and decompression, tissue damaged by the onset of disease is removed along with vertebral elements and intervertebral discs that are impinging on the spinal cord and/or nerves in the spine. Vertebrae can then be fused together through the use of grafts or instrumentation to provide more structural support for the spine and back.

==== Kyphosis progression prevention ====
Surgical intervention is used in patients with kyphosis to primarily prevent the progression of kyphosis in active disease and correct it to a certain extent. However, surgical intervention is not meant to cure kyphosis in the patient and has variable rates of success in eradicating it in a patient. In the event that a patient shows signs of kyphosis, the earlier surgical intervention is given, the better the outcome for the patient.

==== Pediatric surgical interventions ====
In children with Pott's disease, earlier surgical intervention is often recommended to reduce their increased risk for kyphotic deformity. This increased risk for deformity is attributed to both the anatomy and biomechanics of children and their developmental stage of life. Due to the proportions of their bodies (larger head), limited muscular development, and increased flexibility, gravity can lead to greater deformation and presentation of kyphosis. After onset of the disease, growth plates in the spine may be destroyed and vertebral bodies suppressed due to kyphosis. These variable complications would then further deformation, leading to uncontrolled and/or suppressed growth.

== Prognosis ==
- Paraplegia (so-called Pott's paraplegia), presents with refusal to stand or walk. It can generally be used to describe those who have lost feeling in their lower extremities/lower parts of the body or are unable to move them.
- Vertebral collapse resulting in kyphosis, which is defined as an abnormally curved thoracic spine. This abnormal curve in the spine is not to be confused with the natural curve which serves to absorb shock. The main presentation of kyphosis is gradual onset of pain in patients that may be worse with activity.
- Sinus formation is a complex form of recurrent tuberculosis.
- Spinal cord compression occurs and can stop the nerves from functioning properly when pressure builds on the spinal cord. The consequence of this compression and pressure is symptoms such as back pain, trouble walking, and weakness in the arms and/or legs.

== History ==
Evidence of tubercular lesions of the vertebral column have been found from the fourth millennium BC in the form of Mesolithic remains in Liguria, Italy. Additionally, tuberculosis spondylitis has been discovered from 3400 BC in the mummified remains of Egyptians. Tuberculosis had affected humans long before it was identified by Sir Percivall Pott.

Important milestones in the development, understanding, and management of tuberculosis spondylitis include the Bacilli Calmette Guerin (BCG) vaccination in 1945, radiological exams, and accessibility of necessary anti tubular medications in the mid 1900's. MRI and CT scans implemented since 1987 for this disease have helped clinicians catch the disease early as well as identify rare complications of the disease. This helps to prevent further worsening of the disease and promote proper management.

- Saint Gemma of Lucca had tuberculosis of the spine.
- English poets Alexander Pope and William Ernest Henley both had Pott disease.
- Anna Roosevelt Cowles, sister of President Theodore Roosevelt, had Pott disease.
- Søren Kierkegaard may have died from Pott disease, according to professor Kaare Weismann and literature scientist Jens Staubrand
- Chick Webb, a swing-era drummer and band leader, was affected by tuberculosis of the spine as a child, which left him hunchbacked, and eventually caused his death.
- The Sicilian mafia boss Luciano Leggio had the disease and wore a brace.
- Italian writer, poet, and philosopher Giacomo Leopardi had the disease.
- American actor Pat Morita was hospitalized as a child with the disease, and when he recovered, was sent directly to an internment camp.
- It features prominently in the book This Is a Soul, which chronicles the work of American physician Rick Hodes in Ethiopia.
- Jane Addams, social activist and Nobel Peace Prize winner, had Pott disease.
- Willem Ten Boom, brother of Corrie Ten Boom, died of tuberculosis of the spine in December 1946.
- Writer Max Blecher had Pott disease and wrote about the affliction.
- Marxist thinker and Communist leader Antonio Gramsci had Pott disease which, together with the bad conditions of his incarceration in fascist Italy during the 1930s, contributed to his death.
- Gavrilo Princip, who assassinated Archduke Franz Ferdinand of Austria, leading to World War I, died in prison of bone tuberculosis.
- English writer Denton Welch (1915–1948) died of spinal tuberculosis after being involved in a motor accident (1935) that irreparably damaged his spine.
- Louis Joseph, Dauphin of France, son of King Louis XVI and Marie Antoinette
- George Mercer Dawson, Canadian surveyor, geologist and president of the Geological Society of America, had Pott's disease.
- Masaoka Shiki, Japanese poet, author and literary critic, had Pott's disease.
- Lesya Ukrainka, Ukrainian poet, waged, in her own words, "Thirty Years' War with bone tuberculosis".
- Alberto Moravia, Italian writer, was bedridden for five years due to the Pott's disease.
- Lucie Coutaz, French clerical worker who belonged to the French Resistance during the Second World War and afterwards assisted Abbé Pierre in setting up the charity Emmaus, had Pott's disease at 16 years of age.

== In popular culture ==
- Film director Hayao Miyazaki's mother, Yoshiko Miyazaki, was hospitalized for years, then continued treatment for Pott's disease at home. The director's mother is considered an influence on his work, including her health condition.
- Max Blecher's semi-autobiographical novel Inimi cicatrizate (1937) is about a young man named Emanuel who is afflicted with Pott disease in a sanatorium, as is the Radu Jude film Scarred Hearts (2016), loosely based on it.
- A. J. Cronin's story "Two Gentlemen of Verona," includes a character named Lucia with tuberculosis of spine.
- In William Golding's novel The Spire (1964), Jocelin, the dean who wanted a spire on his cathedral, probably dies as a result of the disease.
- Katharine Butler Hathaway's memoir The Little Locksmith (1943) is about the effects of spinal tuberculosis on her childhood and adult life.
- In Victor Hugo's The Hunchback of Notre-Dame (1831) the title character has a gibbus deformity similar to the type caused by spinal tuberculosis.
- In Henrik Ibsen's play A Doll's House (1879), Dr. Rank has "consumption of the spine."
- In Sergio Leone's film Once Upon a Time in the West (1968), Morton, the railroad magnate, has the disease and needs crutches to walk.
- In Ernest Poole's Pulitzer Prize-winning novel, His Family (1917), young Johnny Geer has a terminal case of Pott disease.
- In Edmund Wilson's Memoirs of Hecate County (1946), the novella "The Princess with the Golden Hair," has a character with Pott disease.
