= The Little Locksmith =

1943 memoir by Katharine Butler Hathaway

- First edition
- Author: Katharine Butler Hathaway
- Language: English
- Publisher: Coward-McCann (first edition); The Feminist Press (2000 edition)
- Publication date: October 25, 1943
- Pages: 237

The Little Locksmith is a 1943 memoir by Katharine Butler Hathaway about the effects of spinal tuberculosis on her childhood and adult life.

== Synopsis ==
Hathaway recounts a childhood immobilized on a treatment board, her hard-won mobility, artistic ambitions, and later life in Castine, Maine. Selections appeared in The Atlantic shortly before book publication.

== Reception and in pop culture ==
The book was reviewed contemporaneously in Kirkus Reviews, The New York Times, the Beaumont Journal, the Calgary Herald, and The Toronto Star, while reviews of the 2000 edition were taken in Newsday and Publishers Weekly.

The book is referenced in the Gilmore Girls episode "Help Wanted".

== Publication history ==
- New York: Coward-McCann, 1943 (first ed.)
- New York: The Feminist Press, 2000 (reissue with afterword)
