= Scheuermann's disease =

Skeletal disorder

- Other names: Scheuermann's kyphosis, Calvé disease, idiopathic juvenile kyphosis of the spine
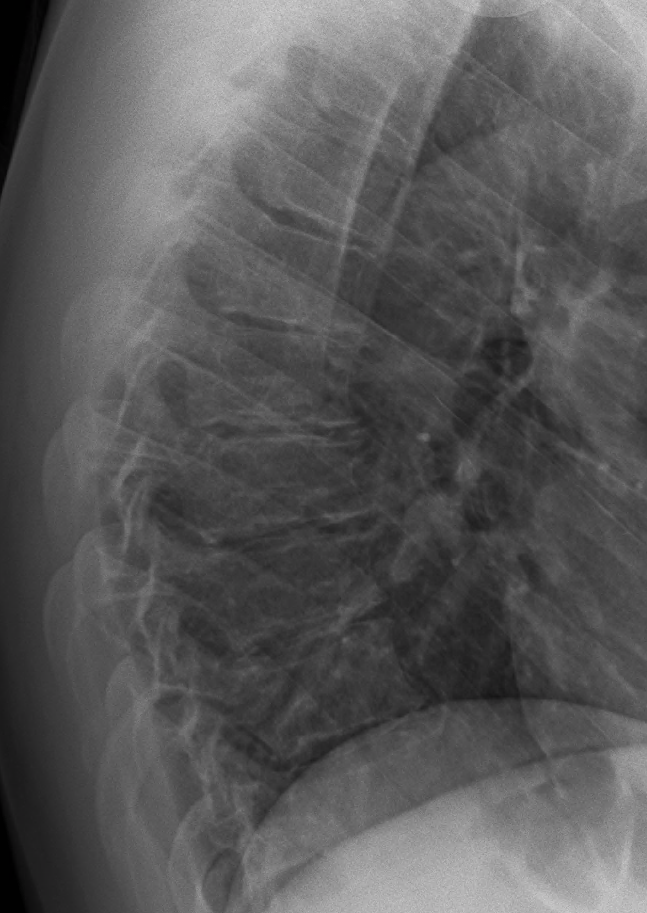
- Scheuermann's disease on lateral Xray of the T spine
- Pronunciation: /ˈʃuːərmən/, though very often mispronounced as 'Sherman'
- Specialty: Orthopaedics, Rheumatology
- Symptoms: Curve of upper back, chronic pain
- Complications: Chronic pain, lower than average bone density hence greater risk for osteoporosis and osteopenia
- Usual onset: Adolescence
- Duration: Lifelong
- Causes: Unknown, Genetic factors
- Diagnostic method: X-ray, MRI
- Treatment: Physical therapy, avoiding excessive weight bearing exercises, back brace, surgery
- Prognosis: Self-limiting
- Prevalence: It has a prevalence of 0.4–8.3% in the population with a higher incidence in Males

Scheuermann's disease is a skeletal disorder. It describes a condition where the vertebrae grow unevenly with respect to the sagittal plane; that is, the posterior angle is often greater than the anterior. This uneven growth results in the signature "wedging" shape of the vertebrae, causing kyphosis. It is named after Danish surgeon Holger Scheuermann.

== Signs and symptoms ==
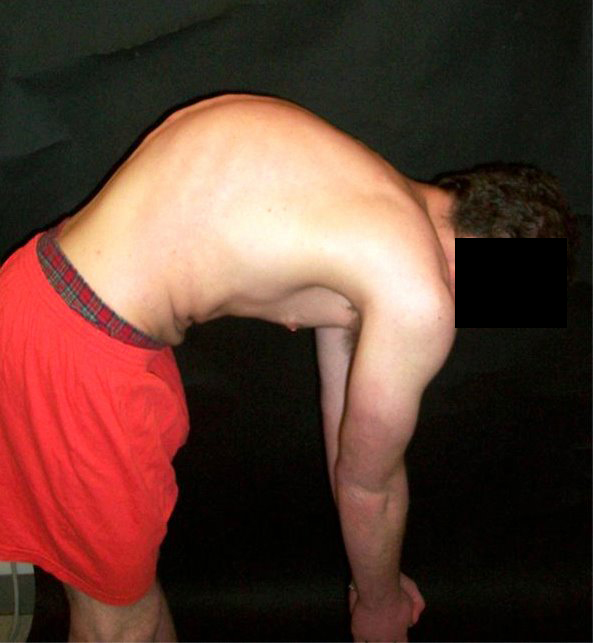
A pre-operative image of a 22-year-old male with a very extreme case of Scheuermann's disease

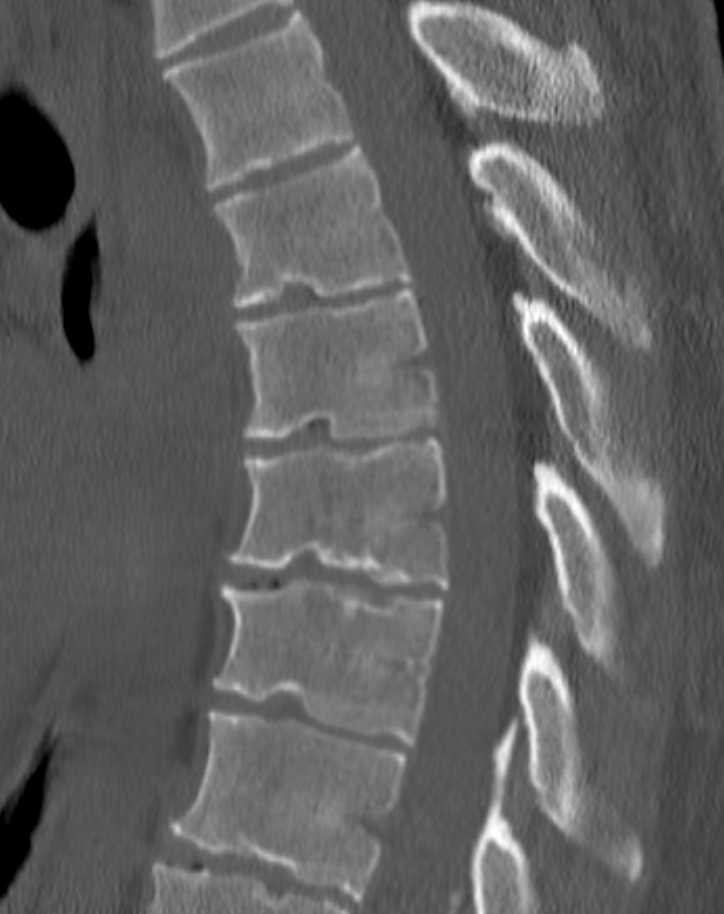
Scheuermann's disease on lateral CT of the T spine

Scheuermann's disease is considered to be a form of osteochondrosis of the spine. It typically develops during adolescence and presents a significantly worse deformity than postural kyphosis. Patients with Scheuermann’s kyphosis cannot consciously correct their posture. The apex of their curve, located in the thoracic vertebrae, is quite rigid.

Scheuermann's disease is notorious for causing lower and mid-level back and neck pain, which can be severe and disabling. The individual may feel pain at the apex of the curve, which is aggravated by physical activity and by periods of standing or sitting; this can have a significantly detrimental effect to their lives as their level of activity is curbed by their disability. The individual may feel isolated or uneasy amongst their peers if they are children, depending on the level of deformity.

In addition to the pain associated with Scheuermann's disease, many individuals with the disorder have loss of vertebral height, and depending on where the apex of the curve is, may have a visual 'hunchback' or 'roundback'. It has been reported that curves in the lower thoracic region cause more pain, whereas curves in the upper region present a more visual deformity. Nevertheless, it is typically pain or cosmetic reasons that prompt sufferers to seek help for their condition. In studies, kyphosis is better characterized for the thoracic spine than for the lumbar spine.

The seventh and tenth thoracic vertebrae are most commonly affected. It causes backache and spinal curvature. In very serious cases it may cause internal problems and spinal cord damage. The curvature of the back decreases height, thus putting pressure on internal organs, wearing them out more quickly than the natural aging process; surgical procedures are almost always recommended in this case.

The degree of thoracic kyphosis among Scheuermann’s patients is not necessarily correlated to back pain, quality of life, or general health.

=== Associated conditions ===
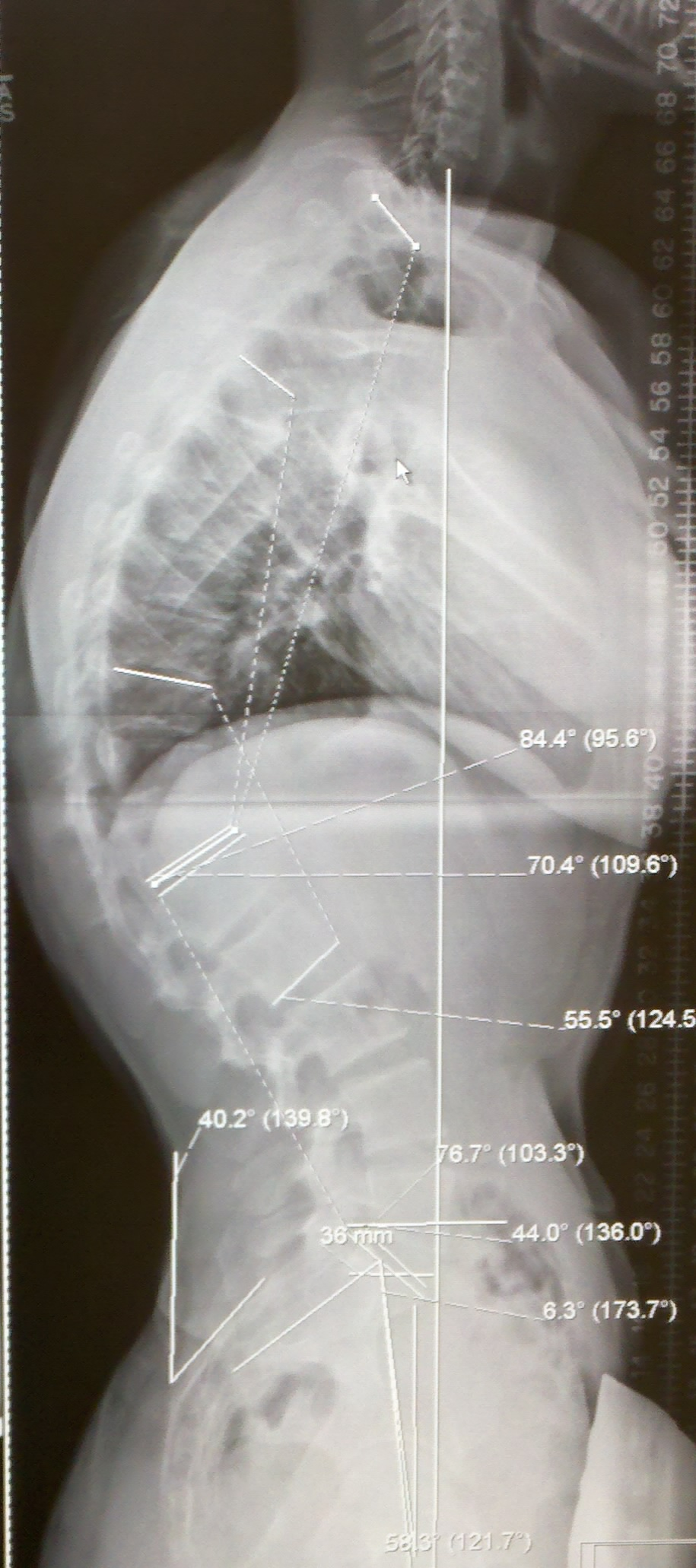
A 20-year-old male with Scheuermann's disease, showing various measurement of kyphotic/lordotic degrees and their supplementary angles. Notice the signature "wedging" shape of the four vertebrae in the lower thoracic area. The other vertebral bodies are otherwise normal. The measured kyphosis for this patient is ~70°.

Many with Scheuermann's disease have an excessive lordotic curve in the lumbar spine; this is the body's natural way to compensate for the kyphotic curve above. Many with Scheuermann's disease have very large lung capacities and individuals often have broad, barrel chests. Most people have forced vital capacity (FVC) scores above average. It has been proposed that this is the body's natural way to compensate for a loss of breathing depth.

Often patients have tight hamstrings, which, again, is related to the body compensating for excessive spinal curvature, though this is also debated (for example, some suggest the tightness of ligament is the initial cause of the growth abnormality). In addition to the common lordosis, it has been suggested that between 20–30% of patients with Scheuermann's Disease also have scoliosis, though most cases are negligible. In more serious cases, however, the combination is classified as a separate condition known as kyphoscoliosis.

Patients with Scheuermann's disease are prone to having a lower than average bone density. They are hence at a statistical greater long term risk for osteopenia and osteoporosis; the reason for this is unknown.

== Causes ==
The cause is not currently known, and the condition appears to be multifactorial. Several candidate genes (such as FBN1, which has been associated with Marfan) have been proposed and excluded. It has also been proposed that there may be an underlying, yet elusive, neurological disorder that plays a role in the eventual development of the disease.

== Diagnosis ==
Diagnosis is typically by medical imaging. The degree of kyphosis can be measured by Cobb's angle and sagittal balance.

== Treatment ==
=== Conservative ===
While there is currently no explanation for what causes Scheuermann's disease, there are ways to treat it. It is most prominent during bone development. Once the patient is fully grown, the bones will maintain the deformity. There are many treatment methods and options available that aim to correct the kyphosis while the spine is still growing, and especially aim to prevent it from worsening. In some cases, the deformity will continue to progress during adulthood.

For less extreme cases, manual medicine, physical therapy and/or back braces can help reverse or stop the kyphosis before it does become severe. Because the disease is often benign, and because back surgery includes many risks, surgery is usually considered a last resort for patients. In Germany, a standard treatment for both Scheuermann's disease and lumbar kyphosis is the Schroth method, a system of specialized physical therapy for scoliosis and related spinal deformities. The method has been shown to reduce pain and decrease kyphotic angle significantly during an inpatient treatment program.

Conservative treatment of Scheuermann's hyperkyphosis in international literature is generally regarded as an effective treatment approach. Physiotherapy and bracing are the first-line treatments for this condition. Braces such as the Scolibrace (kyphobrace) and Kyphologic brace systems have been shown to be effective.

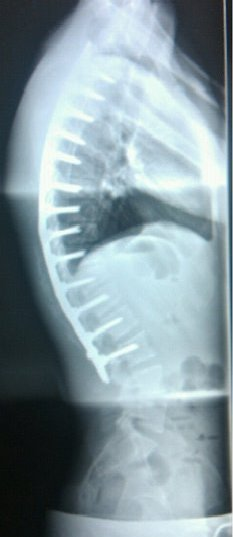
A post-operative X-ray of a 22-year-old male with Scheuermann's disease. After a 13-level spinal fusion to correct the excessive curvature, the person now presents a normal degree of kyphosis, with a minimal loss of flexibility.

=== Surgery ===
In severe or extreme cases, patients may be treated through an extensive surgical procedure in an effort to prevent the disease from worsening or harming the body. The skeletal deformity caused by Scheuermann's disease can be corrected or partially corrected with surgical procedures, almost all of which include multi-level spinal fusion and hardware instrumentation, i.e., rods, pedicle screws, etc. It is important to realize the surgery aims to reduce pain, and not cosmetic defect. As always, surgical intervention should be used as a last resort once conservative treatment fails or the patient's health is in imminent danger as any surgical procedure is not without risk. However, the chances of complication are relatively low, and the surgeries are often successful.

There are two primary surgical techniques to correct kyphosis: posterior-only fusion and anterior/posterior fusion. While debate lingers over which surgical approach is optimal, several studies published since 2018 suggest treatment trends are favoring posterior-only fusion.

The classic surgical procedure entails entering two titanium rods, each roughly 1.5 feet (0.46 m) long (depending on the size of the kyphosis) into the back on either side of the spine. Eight titanium screws and hardware are drilled through the bone to secure the rods onto either side of the spine. On the internal-facing side of the spine, ligaments (which can be too short, pulling the spine into its abnormal shape) must be surgically cut or released, not only stopping part of the cause of the kyphosis, but also allowing the titanium rods to pull the spine into a more natural position. The damaged discs between the troubled vertebrae (wedged vertebrae) are normally removed and replaced with bone grafting from the hip or other parts of the vertebrae, which once healed or "fused" will solidify. The titanium instrumentation holds everything in place during healing. The patient can expect to remain in hospital for a minimum of a week, and possibly longer. They may then be required to wear a brace for several months more to ensure the spine heals appropriately. The titanium instrumentation may stay in the body permanently, or be removed years later. Patients who have undergone such surgery may need physical therapy to manage pain and mobility. Recovery can be prolonged: typically patients are not allowed to lift anything above 5–10 pounds (2.3–4.5 kg) for 6 months to 1 year, and many are out of work for 3 to 6 months. However, once the fusion is solidified, most patients can return to their usual lifestyle within 1–2 years.

== Prognosis ==
Spinal fusion for kyphosis and scoliosis is an extremely invasive surgery. The risk of complications is estimated to be about 10%. Possible complications may be inflammation of the soft tissue or deep inflammatory processes, breathing impairments, bleeding and nerve injuries, or infection. As early as five years after surgery around 5% require reoperation and long-term issues remain unclear.

== Notable cases ==
- Karen Carney (born 1987), former England women's footballer
- Marcel Dettmann (born 1977), German techno DJ
- Angus Gardner (born 1984), Australian rugby union referee
- Milan Lucic (born 1988), professional ice hockey player
- Hunter Pence (born 1983), professional baseball player for the San Francisco Giants
- George Sampson (born 1993), winner of the second series of Britain's Got Talent

== See also ==
- Kyphosis
- Copenhagen disease
- Skeletal disorders
