= Holger Scheuermann =

Danish surgeon (1877–1960)

Holger Werfel Scheuermann (12 February 1877 – 3 March 1960) was a Danish surgeon after whom Scheuermann's disease is named.

== Biography ==
Scheuermann was born into a medical family in Hørsholm, a small town between Copenhagen and Øresund. He began his studies in 1895 and graduated in medicine at the University of Copenhagen in 1902. He then spent his hospital service in Copenhagen at the Frederiks Hospital, at Sankt Johannesstiftelsen, as well as Rigshospitalet. At Rigshospitalet he was assistant at the departments of roentgenology and massage. Scheuermann trained in orthopaedic surgery and radiology, becoming a specialist in orthopaedics and radiology in 1918.

From 1910 to 1919 he was 1st assistant surgeon at the Copenhagen Home for the Crippled and then became director of radiology at the military and Sundby Hospitals, and head physician to the navy. He undertook several study travels to Germany, Austria and Sweden, and was chairman of the Danske Røntgenologers Forening from 1920 until 1922, and of Dansk Radiologisk Selskab from 1933 to 1934. He also became a corresponding member of the American Academy of Orthopaedic Surgeons in 1936, the same year he was made a knight of the Order of the Dannebrog (Dannebrog is the name of the Danish flag).

After his retirement in 1947 he continued in private radiological practice for many years. In 1959 he received his doctoral degree, honoris causa, from the University of Copenhagen, nearly 40 years after his original submission.

Scheuermann died in 1960 in Copenhagen.
