= Kyphosis =

Excessive convex curvature of the lower and middle spine

Hyperkyphosis
- Other names: Roundback, hunchback
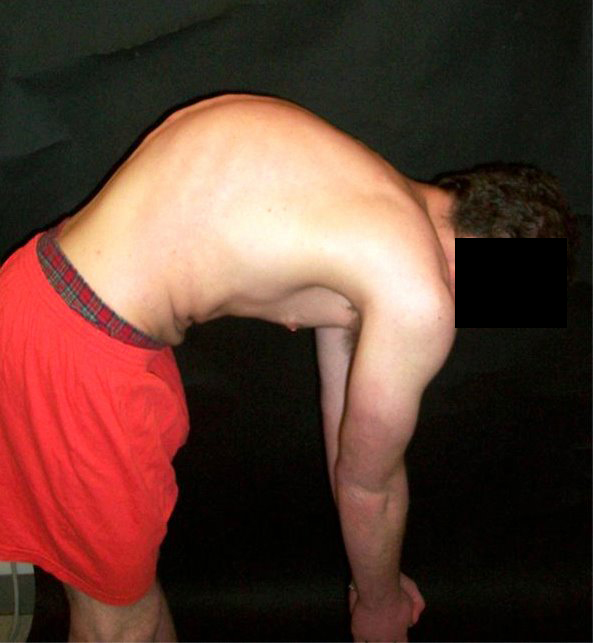
- A preoperative image of a 22-year-old man with Scheuermann's disease, a type of structural kyphosis
- Specialty: Orthopedics

Kyphosis (from Greek κυφός (kyphos) 'hump') is an abnormally excessive convex curvature of the spine as it occurs in the thoracic and sacral regions. Abnormal inward concave lordotic curving of the cervical and lumbar regions of the spine is called lordosis.

It can result from degenerative disc disease; developmental abnormalities, most commonly Scheuermann's disease; Copenhagen disease, osteoporosis with compression fractures of the vertebra; multiple myeloma; or trauma.

A normal thoracic spine extends from the 1st thoracic to the 12th thoracic vertebra and should have a slight kyphotic angle, ranging from 20° to 45°. When the "roundness" of the upper spine increases past 45° it is called kyphosis or "hyperkyphosis". Scheuermann's kyphosis is the most classic form of hyperkyphosis and is the result of wedged vertebrae that develop during adolescence. The cause is not currently known; the condition appears to be multifactorial and is seen more frequently in males.

In the sense of a deformity, it is the pathological curving of the spine, where parts of the spinal column lose some or all of their lordotic profile. This causes a bowing of the back, seen as a slouching posture. Kyphosis is distinguished from scoliosis, a condition in which the spine has a sideways curve.

While most cases of kyphosis are mild and only require routine monitoring, serious cases can be debilitating. High degrees of kyphosis can cause severe pain and discomfort, breathing and digestion difficulties, cardiovascular irregularities, neurological compromise and, in the more severe cases, significantly shortened life spans. These types of high-end curves typically do not respond well to conservative treatment and almost always warrant spinal fusion surgery, which can restore the body's natural degree of curvature.

== Signs and symptoms ==
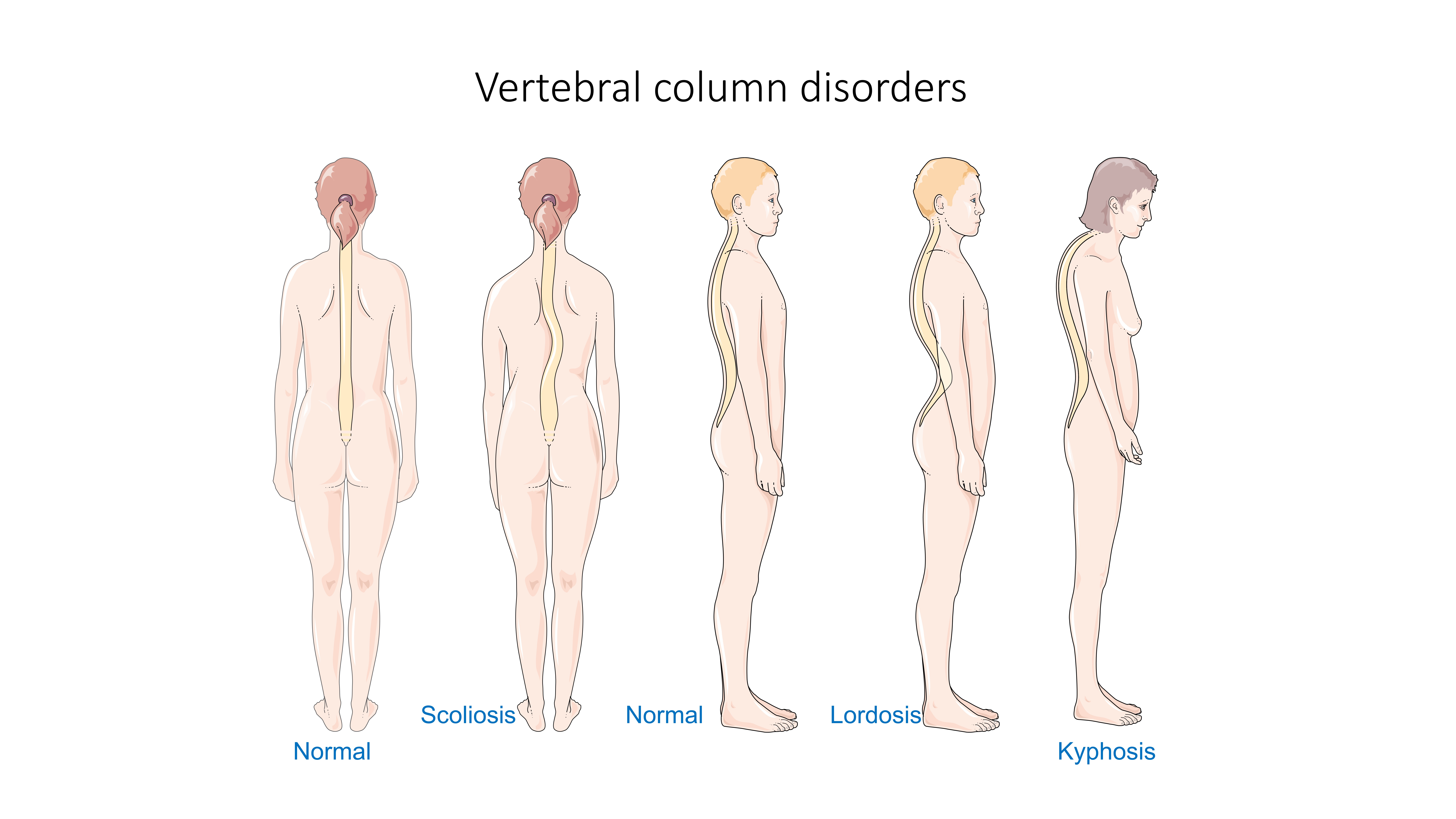
Kyphosis (at far right) in comparison with other vertebral column disorders, including scoliosis and lordosis

=== Complications ===
The risk of serious complications from spinal fusion surgery for kyphosis is estimated to be 5%, similar to the risks of surgery for scoliosis. Possible complications include inflammation of the soft tissue or deep inflammatory processes, breathing impairments, bleeding, and nerve injuries. According to the latest evidence, the actual rate of complications may be substantially higher. Even among those who do not develop serious complications, 5% of patients require reoperation within five years of the procedure, and in general it is not yet clear what one would expect from spine surgery during the long-term. Given that the signs and symptoms of spinal deformity cannot be changed by surgical intervention, surgery remains essentially a cosmetic choice. However, the cosmetic effects of surgery are not necessarily stable.

== Diagnosis ==
=== Classification ===
There are several kinds of kyphosis (ICD-10 codes are provided):

- Postural kyphosis (M40.0), the most common type, normally attributed to slouching, can occur in both the old and the young. In the young, it can be called "slouching" and is reversible by correcting muscular imbalances. In the old, it may be a case of hyperkyphosis and called "dowager's hump". About one third of the most severe hyperkyphosis cases in older people have vertebral fractures. Otherwise, the aging body does tend towards a loss of musculoskeletal integrity, and hyperkyphosis can develop due to aging alone.
- Scheuermann's kyphosis (M42.0) is significantly worse cosmetically and can cause varying degrees of pain, and can also affect different areas of the spine (the most common being the midthoracic area). Scheuermann's kyphosis is considered a form of juvenile osteochondrosis of the spine and is more commonly called Scheuermann's disease. It is found mostly in teenagers and presents a significantly worse deformity than postural kyphosis. A patient with Scheuermann's kyphosis cannot consciously correct posture. The apex of the curve, located in the thoracic vertebrae, is quite rigid. The patient may feel pain at this apex, which can be aggravated by physical activity and by long periods of standing or sitting. This can have a significantly detrimental effect on their lives, as their level of activity is curbed by their condition; they may feel isolated or uneasy amongst peers if they are children, depending on the level of deformity. Whereas in postural kyphosis, the vertebrae and discs appear normal, in Scheuermann's kyphosis, they are irregular, often herniated, and wedge-shaped over at least three adjacent levels. Fatigue is a very common symptom, most likely because of the intense muscle work that has to be put into standing or sitting properly. The condition appears to run in families. Most patients who undergo surgery to correct their kyphosis have Scheuermann's disease.
- Congenital kyphosis (Q76.4) can result in infants whose spinal column has not developed correctly in the womb. Vertebrae may be malformed or fused together and can cause further progressive kyphosis as the child develops. Surgical treatment may be necessary at a very early stage and can help maintain a normal curve in coordination with consistent follow-ups to monitor changes. However, the decision to carry out the procedure can be very difficult due to the potential risks to the child. A congenital kyphosis can also suddenly appear in the teenage years, more commonly in children with cerebral palsy and other neurological disorders.
- Nutritional kyphosis can result from nutritional deficiencies, especially during childhood, such as vitamin D deficiency (producing rickets), which softens bones and results in the curving of the spine and limbs under the child's body weight.
- Gibbus deformity is a form of structural kyphosis, often a sequela to tuberculosis.
- Post-traumatic kyphosis (M84.0) can arise from untreated or ineffectively treated vertebral fractures.

=== Grading ===
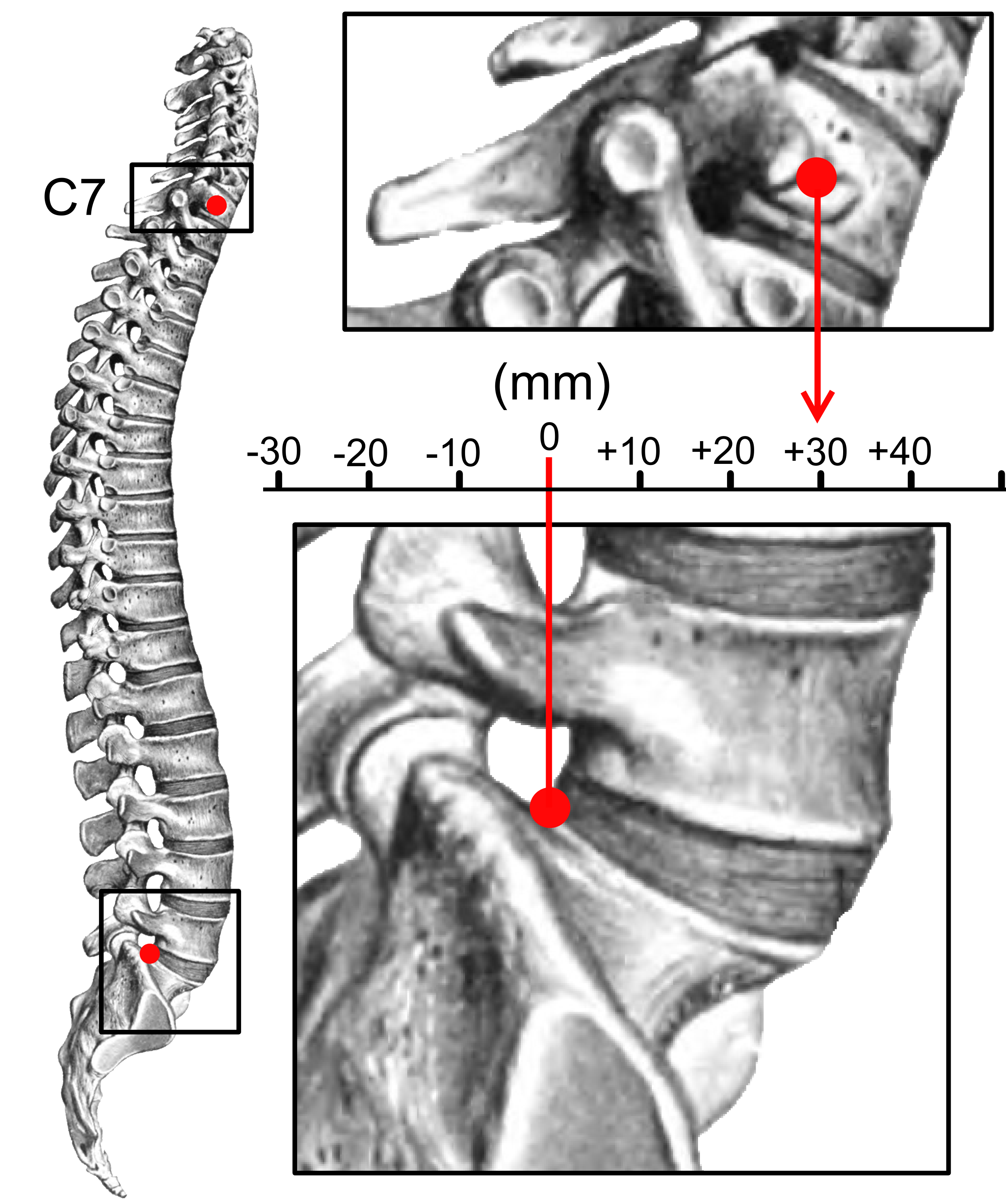
Sagittal balance measurement

Kyphosis can be graded in severity by the Cobb angle. Also, sagittal balance can be measured. The sagittal balance is the horizontal distance between the center of C7 and the superior-posterior border of the endplate of S1 on a lateral radiograph.

== Treatments ==
A diagnosis of kyphosis is generally made through observation and measurement. Idiopathic causes, such as vertebral wedging or other abnormalities, can be confirmed through X-ray. Osteoporosis, a potential cause of kyphosis, can be confirmed with a bone density scan. Postural thoracic kyphosis can often be treated with posture reeducation and focused strengthening exercises. Idiopathic thoracic kyphosis due to vertebral wedging, fractures, or vertebral abnormalities is more difficult to manage, since assuming a correct posture may not be possible with structural changes in the vertebrae. Children who have not completed their growth may show long-lasting improvements with bracing. Exercises may be prescribed to alleviate discomfort associated with overstretched back muscles. A variety of gravity-assisted positions or gentle traction can minimize pain associated with nerve root impingement. Surgery may be recommended for severe idiopathic kyphosis.

=== Brace ===
Body braces showed benefit in a randomised controlled trial.

The Milwaukee brace is one particular body brace that is often used to treat kyphosis in the US. Modern CAD/CAM braces are used in Europe to treat different types of kyphosis. These are much easier to wear and have better in-brace corrections than reported for the Milwaukee brace. Since there are different curve patterns (thoracic, thoracolumbar, and lumbar), different types of brace are in use, with different advantages and disadvantages.

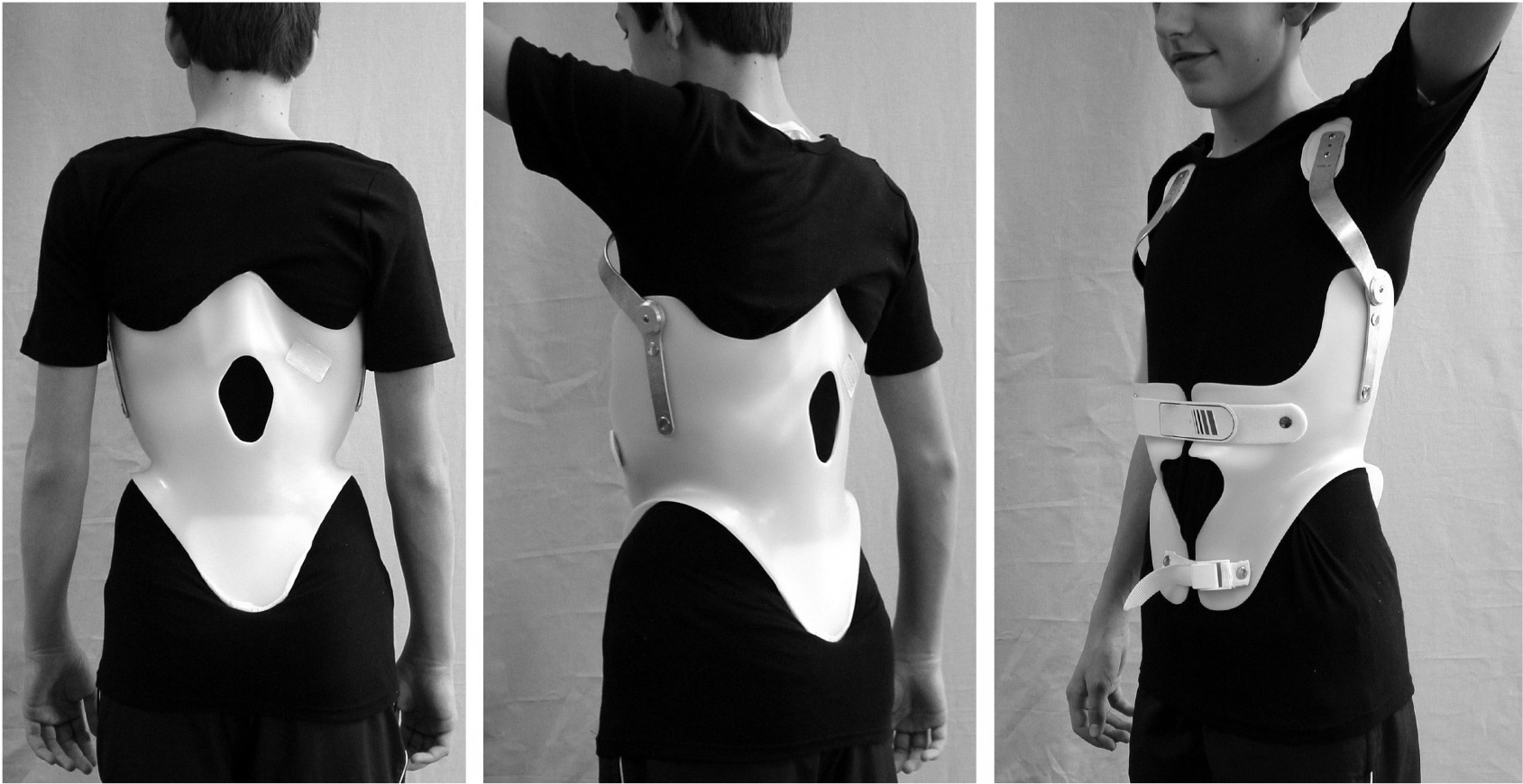
Modern brace for the treatment of a thoracic kyphosis. The brace is constructed using a CAD/CAM device.

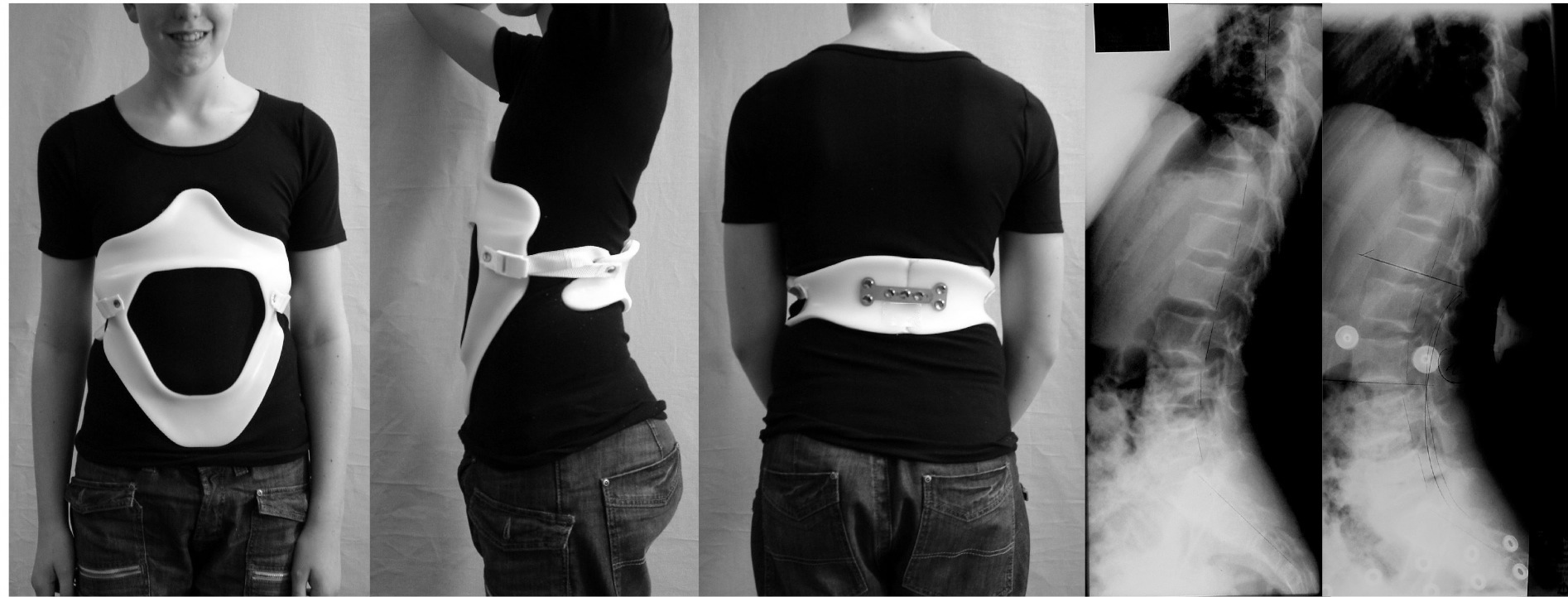
Modern brace for the treatment of lumbar or thoracolumbar kyphosis. The brace is constructed using a CAD/CAM device. Restoration of the lumbar lordosis is the main aim.

=== Physical therapy ===
In Germany, a standard treatment for both Scheuermann's disease and lumbar kyphosis is the Schroth method, a system of physical therapy for scoliosis and related spinal deformities. It involves lying supine, placing a pillow under the scapular region and posteriorly stretching the cervical spine. In China, many people use spinal care mattresses to correct kyphosis while sleeping.

=== Surgery ===
Surgical treatment can be used in severe cases. In patients with progressive kyphotic deformity due to vertebral collapse, a procedure called a kyphoplasty may arrest the deformity and relieve the pain. Kyphoplasty is a minimally invasive procedure, requiring only a small opening in the skin. The main goal is to return the damaged vertebra as close as possible to its original height.

== Society and culture ==
=== People affected by condition ===
- Şehzade Cihangir
- Nicolas Ferry
- Godfrey IV, Duke of Lower Lorraine
- Topper Headon
- Inge the Hunchback
- Konrad II the Hunchback
- Benjamin Lay
- Georg Christoph Lichtenberg
- Louis the Hunchback
- Mahmud I
- Margaret of Bavaria (1442–1479)
- Pepin the Hunchback
- Charles Proteus Steinmetz
- Władysław the Hunchback

=== Popular culture ===
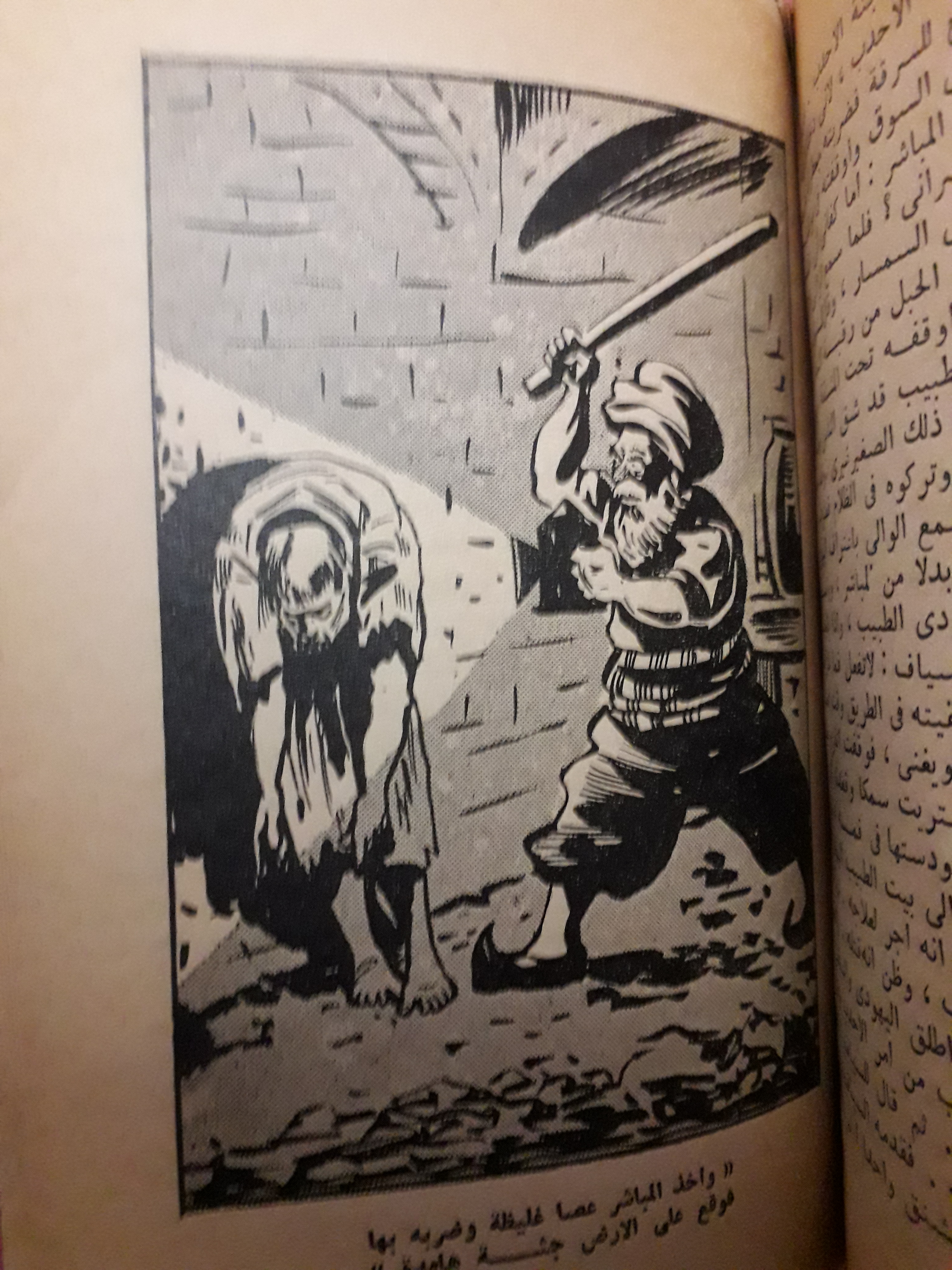
Illustration of "The Little Hunchback", a story from One Thousand and One Nights

One of the most well-known and enduring depictions of kyphosis is Quasimodo, the eponymous hero of Victor Hugo's 1831 novel The Hunchback of Notre-Dame, which solidified the popular conception of the hunchback as a destitute and pitiable outcast from European society. The legendary Comprachicos of the sort popularized in Hugo's similar work The Man Who Laughs are instead described as being able to turn able-bodied young children into hunchbacks, alongside a variety of other deformities, using poisons and mutilation, before selling their results into bondage as court dwarfs or freak show performers.

Early horror films developed the hunchbacked Igor as a stock character assistant to a mad scientist.

In William Shakespeare's play Richard III, the English king Richard III is depicted as having a number of deformities including a hunchback, a trait also displayed in many popular depictions. The discovery of the bones of Richard III revealed that he actually had severe scoliosis, which was apparently garbled in anti-Ricardian propaganda into a hunchback.

== See also ==
- Bethlem myopathy 2
- Ehlers–Danlos syndrome
- Copenhagen disease
- Loeys–Dietz syndrome
- Pott disease
