= Milan Lucic =

Canadian ice hockey player (born 1988)

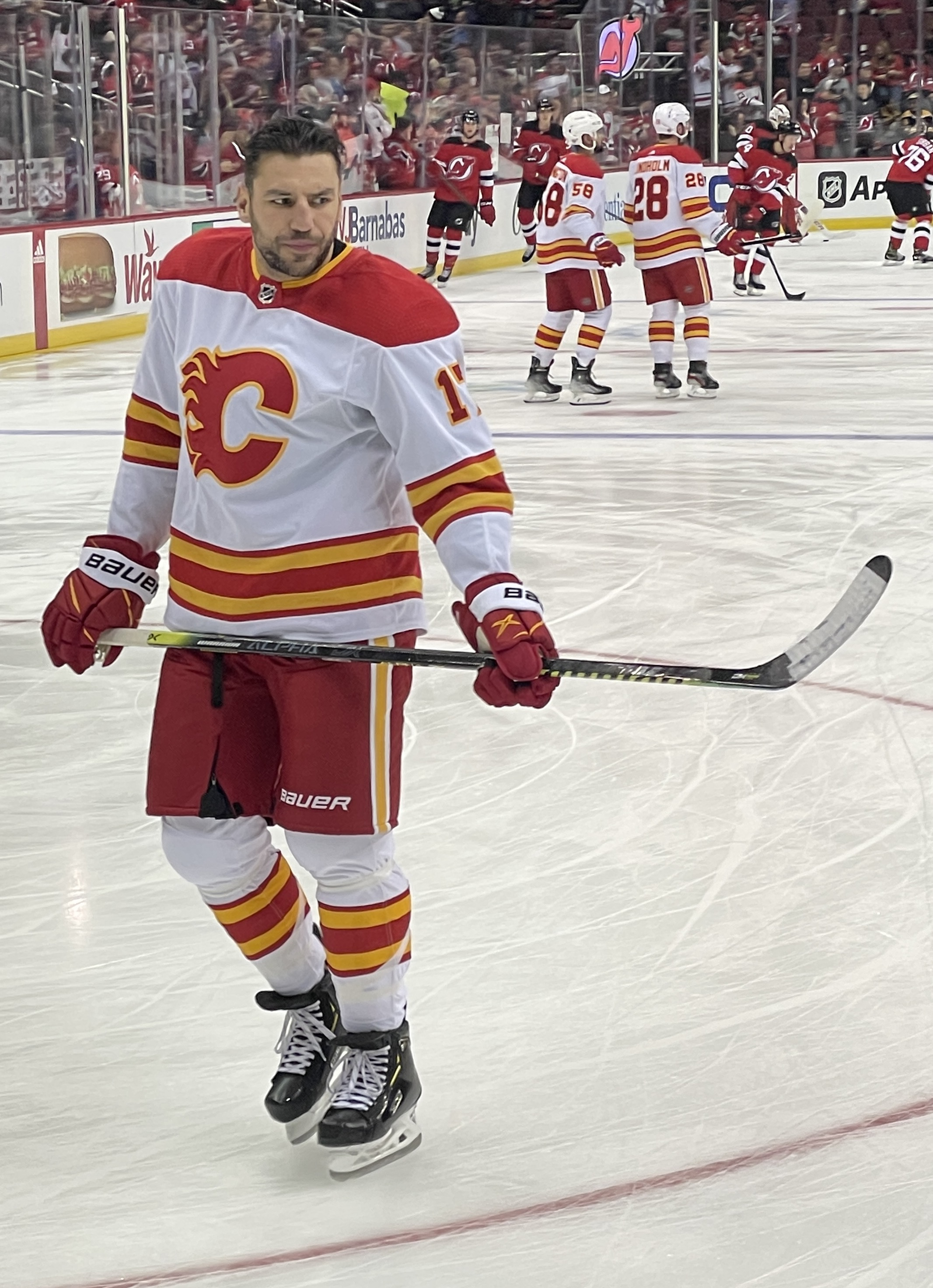
- Lucic with the Calgary Flames in October 2021
- Born: June 7, 1988 (age 38) Vancouver, British Columbia, Canada
- Height: 6 ft 3 in (191 cm)
- Weight: 236 lb (107 kg; 16 st 12 lb)
- Position: Left wing
- Played for: Boston Bruins; Los Angeles Kings; Edmonton Oilers; Calgary Flames; Fife Flyers
- National team: Canada
- NHL draft: 50th overall, 2006; Boston Bruins
- Playing career: 2007–2026

Milan Lucic (Serbian pronunciation: [mǐlan lûːtʃitɕ]; born June 7, 1988) is a Canadian former professional ice hockey player who played 17 seasons in the National Hockey League (NHL). He played his major junior career with the Vancouver Giants of the Western Hockey League (WHL) for three seasons and captured the Memorial Cup, while being named tournament MVP in 2007. He was selected 50th overall in the 2006 NHL entry draft and made the Boston Bruins roster at the age of nineteen in 2007–08. Three years later, he won a Stanley Cup with the Bruins. He spent the first eight seasons of his NHL career with Boston before being traded to the Los Angeles Kings in June 2015. Following a single season in Los Angeles, Lucic signed as a free agent with the Edmonton Oilers in July 2016, playing three seasons for the Oilers before being traded to the Calgary Flames in July 2019. He then briefly returned to Boston, before his release due to a domestic violence arrest. After spending one year out of hockey, Lucic played parts of the 2025–26 season with the Springfield Thunderbirds of the American Hockey League (AHL) and Fife Flyers of the Elite Ice Hockey League (EIHL), before announcing his retirement in 2026.

At international level, Lucic captained the Canada junior team at the 2007 Super Series. He plays physically in the style of a power forward.

== Early life ==
Lucic was born in East Vancouver to Serbian couple Dobrivoje "Dobro" Lučić and Snežana Kesa. His father, Dobro, was a longshoreman in Vancouver who immigrated to North America from his native Serbia when he was 27. His mother, Snezana, came to Vancouver when her parents moved from Serbia when she was just 2. He has a younger brother named Nikola and an older brother named Jovan. His maternal uncle, Dan Kesa, is a former NHL right winger who played for the Vancouver Canucks, Pittsburgh Penguins, Tampa Bay Lightning and Dallas Stars.

Lucic attended Killarney Secondary in Vancouver. He was a fan of the hometown Vancouver Canucks and has named forward Todd Bertuzzi as one of his favourite players when following the team. At age 15, Lucic was diagnosed with Scheuermann's disease, a condition that can cause the upper back to curve and has given him a hunched-over posture.

Lucic played minor ice hockey (VMHA) in Vancouver, but nearly quit the sport after being passed up in the 2003 WHL bantam draft. He was invited to play for the Coquitlam Express of the Junior A British Columbia Hockey League (BCHL), but was further demoralized when he initially failed to make the team out of rookie camp. He agreed to play, instead, for the Junior B Delta Ice Hawks, but later played his way onto the Express after five games.

== Playing career ==
=== Amateur ===
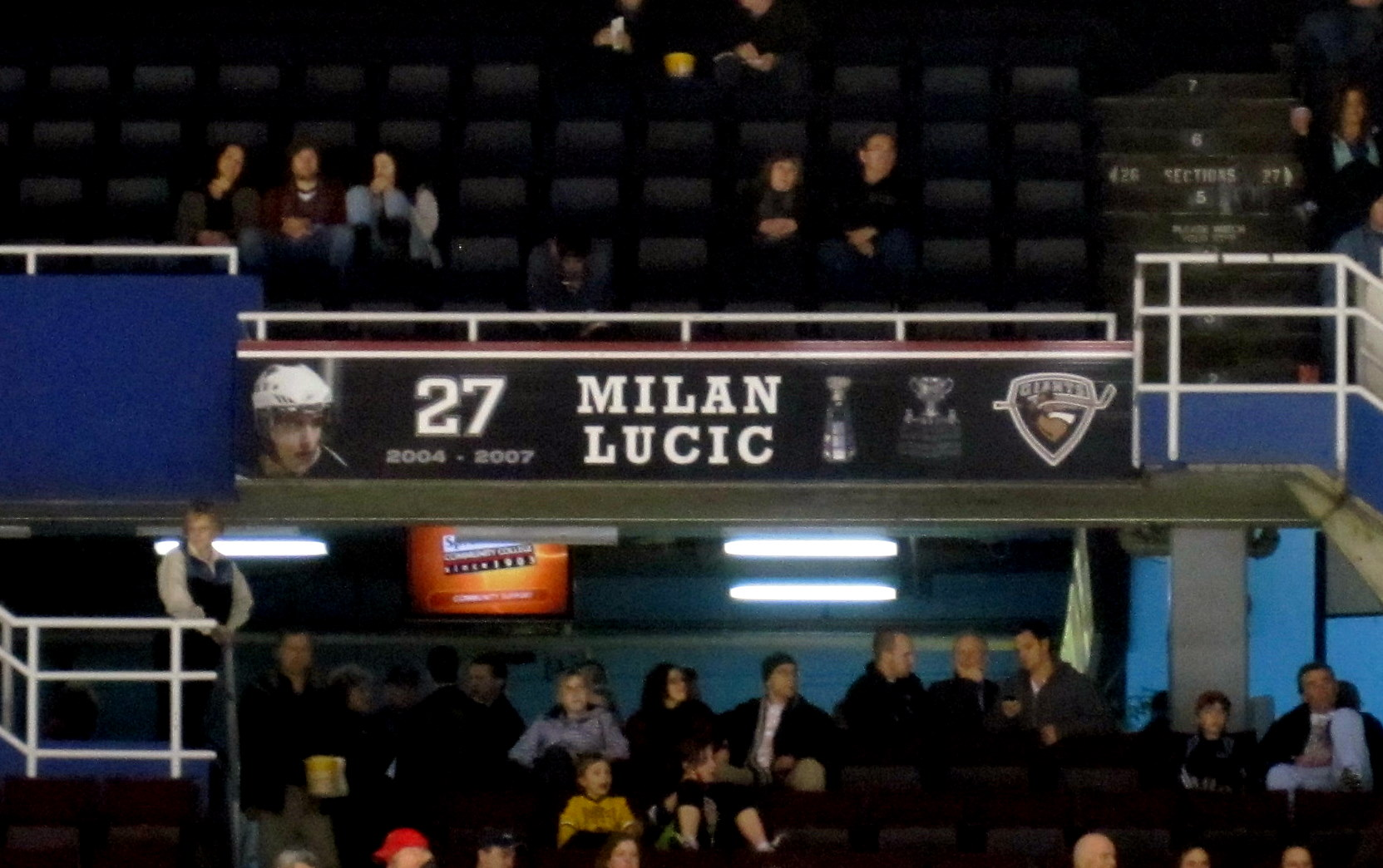
Lucic's banner in the Giants' Ring of Honour

Lucic began his junior career with the Coquitlam Express of the BCHL in 2004–05. In the same season, he made his major junior debut with the Vancouver Giants, his hometown Western Hockey League (WHL) team, playing in one regular season game and two playoff games. He joined the Giants full-time in 2005–06, scoring 19 points in 62 games. He added seven points in 18 playoff games to help the Giants to a WHL title and an appearance in the 2006 Memorial Cup. In the off-season, he was selected 50th overall by the Boston Bruins in the second round of the 2006 NHL entry draft. Bruins management had considered taking Lucic earlier in the second round with the 37th overall pick but chose defenceman Yuri Alexandrov instead. Bruins Director of Scouting Scott Bradley admitted he did not expect Lucic to still be available with the 50th pick, adding, "We were fortunate to get him."

The following season, in 2006–07, Lucic emerged as one of the Giants' leaders, finishing first in team scoring with 68 points in 70 games. He added 19 points in 22 postseason games as the Giants lost the WHL Finals to the Medicine Hat Tigers in seven games. Despite losing the WHL title, Vancouver appeared in the 2007 Memorial Cup as tournament hosts. Lucic and the Giants met Medicine Hat once more in the tournament final, capturing the Canadian Hockey League (CHL) title by a 3–1 score. Lucic assisted on Michal Řepík's tournament-winning goal with five minutes to play in regulation. He finished the tournament tied for the lead in scoring with Řepík (with more goals, Řepík was awarded the Ed Chynoweth Trophy as leading scorer) and earned the Stafford Smythe Memorial Trophy as tournament MVP.

Nearly four years after his last junior game, Lucic was honoured by the Giants before a game against the Chilliwack Bruins on February 25, 2011. Dubbed "Milan Lucic Night," he was added to the club's Ring of Honour, showcasing the top Giants alumni of all time. The first 500 game attendees were also given free Lucic bobblehead dolls. As part of the team's tenth anniversary, he was also voted by fans as the team's best player of all time.

=== Professional ===
==== Boston Bruins (2007–2015) ====
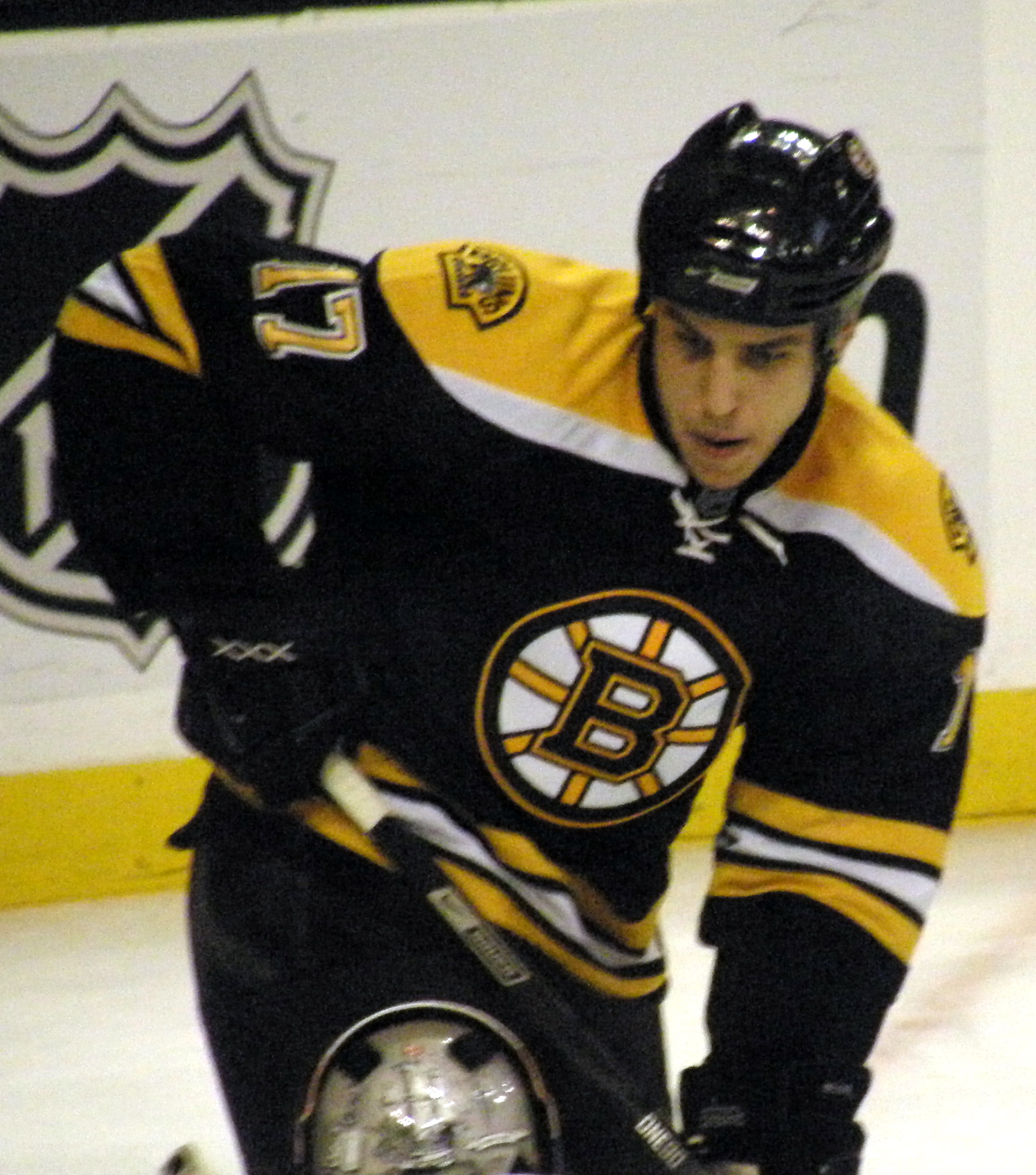
Lucic with the Bruins in January 2008

In the 2007 off-season, Lucic signed an entry-level contract with the Bruins on August 2. He had been chosen as the Giants' next team captain, but made the Bruins' 2007–08 opening roster out of training camp. He played in his first career NHL game on October 5, 2007, a 4–1 loss to the Dallas Stars, in which he fought opposing forward Brad Winchester. His first goal came a week later on October 12 against Jonathan Bernier, a game winner, in an 8–6 win against the Los Angeles Kings. By also fighting Kings forward Raitis Ivanāns and notching an assist, he recorded a Gordie Howe hat trick (an unofficial statistic constituting a goal, an assist and a fight in one game). Unsure of whether the Bruins would keep him or return him to junior, he stayed in a downtown hotel in Boston to start the season. However, Lucic made enough of an impression during his first set of games with the Bruins, showing grit and consistent willingness to fight (he recorded 13 fighting majors in his rookie season), that they decided to keep him in the lineup. Bruins management informed the Giants before Lucic's tenth game, accounting for the NHL's nine-game maximum for junior-eligible players to stay with their NHL club without initiating their contract. He was chosen to participate in the 2008 NHL YoungStars Game and finished his rookie campaign with eight goals and 27 points. Towards the end of the season, he was voted by Bruins fans for the team's Seventh Player Award for exceeding expectations. Matched up against the first-seeded Montreal Canadiens in the opening round, Lucic scored his first Stanley Cup playoffs goal in game 3 on April 13, 2008. He finished his first NHL postseason with two goals as the Bruins were defeated by the Canadiens in seven games.

Early into the 2008–09 season, Lucic recorded his first career NHL hat-trick and added an assist in a 5–4 win against the Atlanta Thrashers on October 25, 2008. Later that week, Lucic made a much-publicized return to his hometown in a game against the Vancouver Canucks, which featured a picture of him as a baby on the back page of Vancouver's The Province newspaper. Earlier in the year, Lucic's 2007 Memorial Cup ring had been stolen from his home in East Vancouver on July 10, 2008. In a private ceremony before the game against the Canucks, he was presented a replacement ring by Vancouver Giants ownership.

Lucic was chosen to his second YoungStars Game in January 2009. However, he did not compete for the sophomores in Montreal due to an undisclosed upper-body injury. Near the end of the season, on April 4, 2009, Lucic was awarded the Bruins' Eddie Shore Award for hustle and determination. He finished his second NHL season improving to 17 goals and 42 points in 72 games, while playing predominantly on a line with the Bruins' top centre, Marc Savard.

Entering the 2009 playoffs with the Bruins as the first seed in the Eastern Conference, Lucic received a one-game suspension after delivering a cross-check to the head of Montreal Canadiens forward Maxim Lapierre in game 2 of the first round. While the Bruins argued that Lucic used predominantly his glove, rather than his stick, the League held its decision. After serving his suspension, Lucic and the Bruins went on to sweep the Canadiens, advancing to the second round against the Carolina Hurricanes, to whom the Bruins lost in seven games. Lucic added nine points in ten games in the playoffs.

With the 2009–10 season marking the final year of his original entry-level contract, it was announced on October 6, 2009, that Lucic had been signed to a three-year, US$12.25 million contract extension with the Bruins through to the 2012–13 season. The deal is structured at US$4 million for the first two seasons and US$4.25 million in the third, a raise from his US$685,000 base salary in 2009–10. Ten days later, on October 16, he suffered a broken finger requiring surgery in a game against the Dallas Stars while hitting defenceman Stéphane Robidas. Lucic returned to the Bruins lineup on November 19 but was injured again four games later, suffering a sprained ankle in a game against the Minnesota Wild on November 25. His left leg had buckled from underneath him while reaching behind him to receive a pass from teammate Dennis Wideman. Missing an additional 18 games, Lucic was limited to 50 contests in his third NHL season. His play was perceived by Head Coach Claude Julien to have suffered following the two injuries; he recorded nine goals and 20 points to finish the regular season. He added nine points in 13 playoff games as the Bruins were defeated in the second round by the Philadelphia Flyers. They became the third team in NHL history to lose a playoff series after having led three games to none. All five goals Lucic scored in the playoffs were recorded in the second round, including two in the deciding seventh game, which the Bruins lost 4–3.

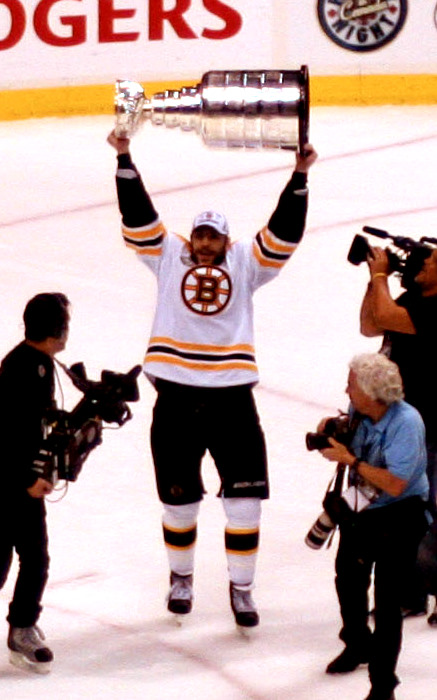
Lucic celebrates with the Stanley Cup following the Bruins' game 7 win in the 2011 Stanley Cup Final.

In the second month of the 2010–11 season, Lucic recorded a natural hat-trick on November 18, 2010, during a 4–0 win over the Florida Panthers. Later in the campaign, he was fined $3,500 by the NHL for his actions during a game against Atlanta on December 23. After Lucic was hit by opposing defenceman Freddy Meyer, teammate Andrew Ference engaged Meyer in a fight. In the ensuing scrum, Lucic punched Meyer as the two were being restrained by referees, resulting in a match penalty. Three days following the game, Lucic received a $2,500 fine for his punch and an additional $1,000 for an obscene gesture he had made to players on the Thrashers' bench immediately afterward. In January 2011, he missed three games with a shoulder injury. Lucic completed the season with a career-high 30 goals, 32 assists and 62 points in 79 games. He led the Bruins in goal-scoring while tying for the points lead with centre David Krejčí. Entering the 2011 playoffs as the third seed in the East, the Bruins eliminated the Montreal Canadiens, Philadelphia Flyers and Tampa Bay Lightning in the first three rounds, en route to the Stanley Cup Final against Vancouver. Although Lucic scored below his regular season pace during the postseason with 12 points (five goals and seven assists) in 25 games, he helped the Bruins to their first Stanley Cup since 1972, as the team defeated the Canucks in game 7 of the Cup Final. It was later reported that Lucic was playing through a couple of injuries during the playoffs. During the Eastern Conference finals, he suffered a broken toe after blocking a shot from teammate Tyler Seguin during practice. He also struggled with a sinus infection, which was part of a larger problem in his right nostril that traced back to the end of the 2009–10 season and caused improper breathing. Lucic underwent surgery in the off-season to repair the sinus.

In August 2011, Lucic had his customary day in possession of the Stanley Cup, which he spent in Vancouver. While it is traditional for players to host public celebrations with the trophy in their hometowns, Lucic chose to keep the day private, explaining that "I grew up a Canucks fan. I know how it is." Following the Canucks' defeat in the Cup Final, fans had staged an hours-long riot in Downtown Vancouver. More personally, posters of Lucic at a local cultural community centre were defaced. Also, an appearance by Lucic at a Greek festival in Vancouver sparked a public brawl; The Vancouver Sun reported that Lucic did not throw any punches. While Lucic's day with the Cup was private, many of his functions were held in public venues, which were reportedly well received by passers-by. He brought the trophy to his hometown church, St. Archangel Michael Serbian Orthodox Church in Burnaby, for a gathering of approximately 350 people and on a harbour cruise with friends and family. He finished the day atop Grouse Mountain, the same place where he and his Vancouver Giants teammates took the Memorial Cup after their CHL victory in 2007. Months later, in February 2012, the church he brought the trophy to was vandalized. A month and a half into the 2011–12 season, Lucic received considerable attention for a hit against opposing goaltender Ryan Miller during a game against the Buffalo Sabres. Miller had come out of his net to play a puck that Lucic last touched midway between the centre line and the Sabres' blue line. As Miller shot the puck towards the end-boards, Lucic collided with him heavily, knocking him to the ice. Miller was diagnosed with a concussion and was sidelined for several games; (Note: Miller later speculated that the injury was more of a neck issue.) he also heavily criticized Lucic for his actions and called him a "gutless piece of shit" in post-game comments. The day after the hit, the NHL held a hearing with Lucic and later announced that he would not be suspended for the play, citing that the minor penalty for charging that was assessed during the game was sufficient. A few weeks after this incident, he received a one-game suspension for an illegal hit on Philadelphia forward Zac Rinaldo. Lucic hit Rinaldo from behind during a battle for the puck along the boards, although he was not seriously injured on the play.

A short time into the 2013–14 season, Lucic scored his first-ever NHL overtime goal to break a 2–2 tie game at home against the visiting Columbus Blue Jackets.

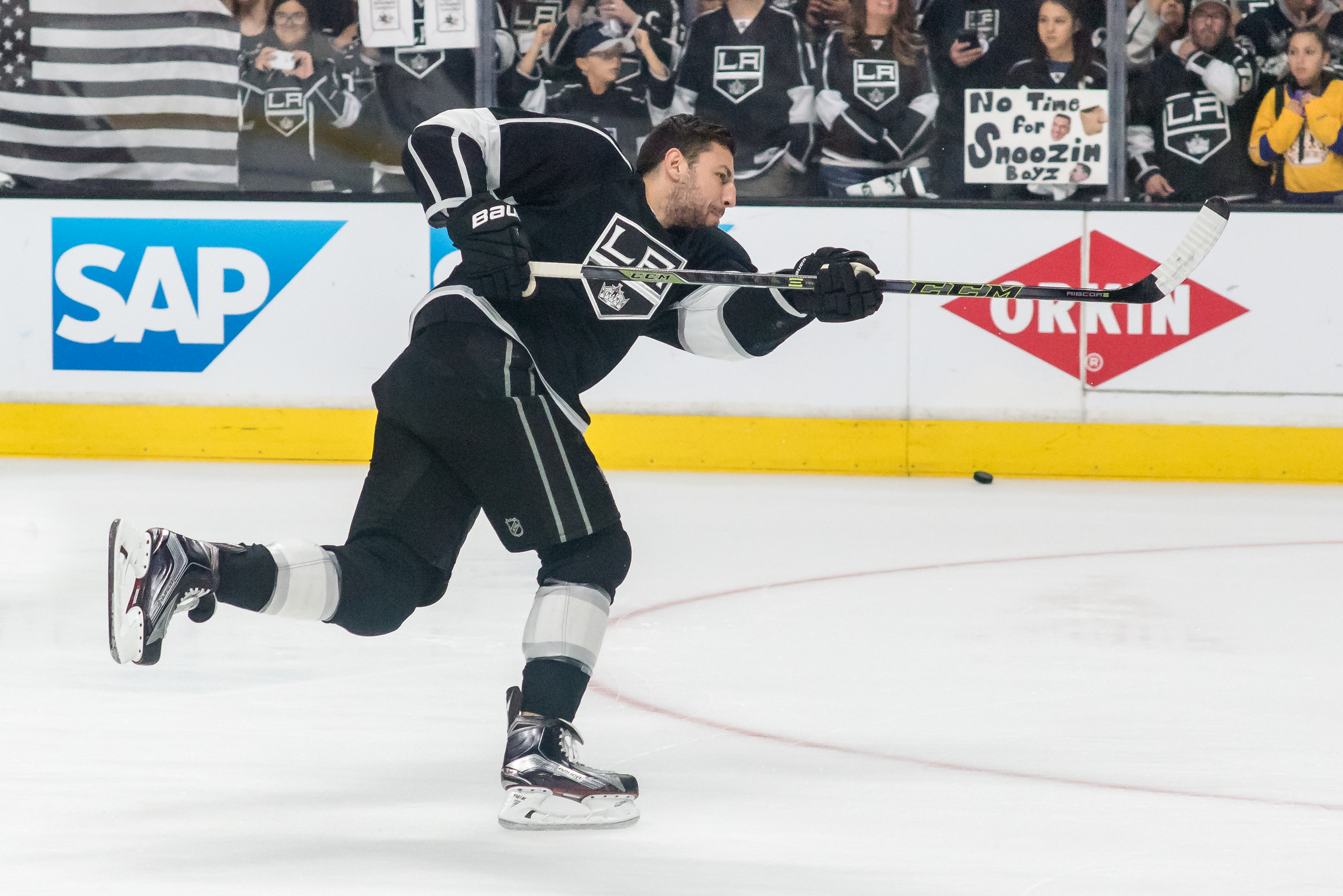
Lucic with the Los Angeles Kings in April 2016

==== Los Angeles Kings (2015–2016) ====
On June 26, 2015, Lucic was traded to the Los Angeles Kings in exchange for goaltender Martin Jones, Colin Miller and a first-round pick in the 2015 NHL entry draft. Lucic excelled during his season with the Kings, playing a strong two-way game while recording 20 goals, 35 assists for 55 points during the regular season. Lucic also added three assists in five games in the 2016 playoffs.

==== Edmonton Oilers (2016–2019) ====
As an unrestricted free agent, on the opening day of free agency, Lucic signed a seven-year, $42 million contract with the Edmonton Oilers on July 1, 2016. As his usual jersey number 17 was retired by the Oilers for Jari Kurri, he switched to number 27, his number during his junior years. Lucic enjoyed a successful first year with the Oilers, tallying 23 goals and 50 points to help lead the team to the playoffs for the first time since 2006. The Oilers defeated the San Jose Sharks in six games but lost to the Anaheim Ducks in seven games with Lucic scoring six points in 13 playoff games.

Following his first season in Edmonton, Lucic's production began to dramatically decline. A disappointing second season saw Lucic score just 10 goals and 34 points.

This was followed up by scoring just six goals and 20 points in his third year with the Oilers, including a goal drought of over 40 games.

==== Calgary Flames (2019–2023) ====
On July 19, 2019, Lucic waived his no-movement clause and was traded, along with a conditional 2020 third-round draft choice, to the Calgary Flames in exchange for James Neal. Both Neal and Lucic had struggled to live up to the expectations attached to their large salaries on their previous teams and the trade gave both players a chance for a fresh start. Lucic switched back to his familiar no. 17 with the Flames. Lucic began his tenure with the Flames on a prolonged goal drought, made more notorious by Neal scoring seven goals (including a four-goal game) in his first seven games with the Oilers. On November 2, 2019, during his cold streak, Lucic received a 2-game suspension for roughing Kole Sherwood in a game the previous night against the Columbus Blue Jackets. Lucic's slow start, coupled with concerns about his role on the team and lack of playing time, led him to contemplate retirement early in the season. Finally, in his 28th game of the 2019–20 season, Lucic scored his first goal as a Flame, converting on a pass by Derek Ryan in a 4–3 victory over the Buffalo Sabres. Lucic followed that goal with two more in his next three games. By March 2020, when the last three weeks of the season were canceled due to the COVID-19 pandemic, Lucic had eight goals, with only Elias Lindholm, Sean Monahan, and Johnny Gaudreau having recorded more than Lucic's five powerplay goals on the season. At the time of the Lucic-for-Neal trade, the Flames and Oilers had agreed that should Neal score at least 21 goals in the 2019–20 NHL season and Lucic score at least 10 fewer goals than Neal, the Oilers would owe the Flames a third-round draft choice in the 2020 draft. Due to the abrupt and incomplete finish to the 2019–20 season, the Flames and Oilers remained at an impasse over how to resolve the trade condition, given that Neal finished with 19 goals (two fewer than the required threshold) but was on pace to surpass 21 if the season played to its 82-game conclusion. On July 31, 2020, the NHL ruled that the Oilers owed the Flames a third-round draft choice in Edmonton's choice of either the 2020 or 2021 drafts as a result of a trade condition the two teams had made as part of the Lucic/Neal swap.

On April 13, 2021, Lucic played his 1000th NHL game, becoming the 352nd player to reach the 1,000-game mark.

==== Return to Boston (2023–2024) ====
On July 1, 2023, Lucic returned to Boston, signing a one-year, $1 million contract with the team. Only four games into his season, Lucic took a puck to the ankle and was placed on long-term injured reserve by the Bruins. On November 18, 2023, while still out of the lineup due to injury, Lucic was arrested in Boston for a "domestic incident" involving his wife. On November 21, he pled not guilty to assault and battery, the charges were dropped on February 16, 2024 after his wife refused to testify. Lucic was given an indefinite leave of absence that, combined with his injury, meant that he did not play for the remainder of the 2023–24 season. He also entered the NHL/NHLPA Assistance Program.

==== St. Louis Blues (PTO) (2025) ====
After a year's hiatus from professional hockey, Lucic was signed to a professional tryout (PTO) to attend the St. Louis Blues training camp on August 19, 2025. Four games into the preseason, Lucic suffered a lower-body injury, and the Blues subsequently extended his PTO on several occasions during his rehabilitation. Following his recovery, Lucic was released from his Blues PTO, but signed another PTO with the Blues' American Hockey League (AHL) affiliate, the Springfield Thunderbirds, on November 4, 2025; this marked the first AHL games of Lucic's career. Less than a month later, on November 25, Lucic's PTO was terminated by the Thunderbirds.

==== Fife Flyers and retirement (2025–2026) ====
On December 18, 2025, Lucic signed a one-year contract with the Fife Flyers of the Elite Ice Hockey League (EIHL). Following a 26-game tenure with Fife that included him punching a teammate after a loss, Lucic announced his retirement from hockey following the season on June 7, 2026.

==== Post retirement (2026–present) ====
On June 30, 2026, it was announced the Buffalo Sabres had hired Lucic as a pro scout.

== International play ==
Medal record

Men's ice hockey

Representing Canada

World Championships
| Gold medal – first place | 2023 Finland/Latvia | |

In the off-season following Lucic's MVP performance at the 2007 Memorial Cup, he was named team captain of Canada junior team for the 2007 Super Series against Russia. The series, an eight-game competition between Canada and Russia's under-20 teams, commemorated the 35th anniversary of the historic 1972 Summit Series. He recorded three assists as Canada won the series with seven wins and a tie.

Two years later, Lucic was invited to Canada senior team's summer orientation camp in Calgary for the 2010 Winter Olympics. He was not, however, chosen to the final roster. Lucic was also invited to the orientation camp for the 2014 Winter Olympics, but again did not make the final roster.

Lucic was named to the roster for the 2023 World Championship, winning gold with the team.

== Personal life ==
Lucic has Scheuermann's disease. He married Brittany Carnegie in 2012; they have three children. Lucic has spoken about the importance of mental health and suicide awareness, including his own personal struggles after the suicide of his father. In an interview with the Calgary Sun, he commented that "it’s OK to reach out for help and there are outlets to help you with whatever you’re going through, and I think it’s important to be honest with yourself and honest with others."

Lucic has also been involved in anti-bullying campaigns. In 2014, he and his wife co-authored the children's book Not Cool to Bully in School, which he promoted by giving private readings to boys' and girls' clubs in Boston. Proceeds from the book were given to the Celebrities for Charity foundation. He has hosted the annual Rock and Jock celebrity softball game at LeLacheur Park, which fundraises for Celebrities for Charity, three times.

On November 18, 2023 at approximately 1 a.m., Lucic entered into a verbal argument with his then-wife Brittany when he could not find his cell phone, and accused his wife of hiding it. According to Brittany Lucic, Milan Lucic yelled at her, grabbed her hair, pulled her backwards, and told her she "was not going anywhere." According to police, Lucic appeared intoxicated when officers arrived at the home. The police report also stated that Milan Lucic attempted to choke his wife. Milan was arrested and charged with assault and battery, and pleaded not guilty to those charges on November 21, 2023. On February 16, 2024, prosecutors dropped their charges against Milan Lucic after Brittany Lucic chose not to testify against Milan, invoking the evidentiary legal principle known as marital privilege to avoid being subpoenaed. On April 24, 2024 Brittany Lucic filed for divorce from Milan citing "irreconcilable differences" as the reason for the divorce.

== Career statistics ==
=== Regular season and playoffs ===
| | | | Regular season | | | | | Playoffs |
| Season | Team | League | GP | G | A | Pts | PIM | GP | G | A | Pts | PIM |
|---|---|---|---|---|---|---|---|---|---|---|---|---|
| 2004–05 | Coquitlam Express | BCHL | 50 | 9 | 14 | 23 | 101 | — | — | — | — | — |
| 2004–05 | Vancouver Giants | WHL | 1 | 0 | 0 | 0 | 2 | 2 | 0 | 0 | 0 | 0 |
| 2005–06 | Vancouver Giants | WHL | 62 | 9 | 10 | 19 | 149 | 18 | 3 | 4 | 7 | 23 |
| 2006–07 | Vancouver Giants | WHL | 70 | 30 | 38 | 68 | 147 | 22 | 7 | 12 | 19 | 26 |
| 2007–08 | Boston Bruins | NHL | 77 | 8 | 19 | 27 | 89 | 7 | 2 | 0 | 2 | 4 |
| 2008–09 | Boston Bruins | NHL | 72 | 17 | 25 | 42 | 136 | 10 | 3 | 6 | 9 | 43 |
| 2009–10 | Boston Bruins | NHL | 50 | 9 | 11 | 20 | 44 | 13 | 5 | 4 | 9 | 19 |
| 2010–11 | Boston Bruins | NHL | 79 | 30 | 32 | 62 | 121 | 25 | 5 | 7 | 12 | 63 |
| 2011–12 | Boston Bruins | NHL | 81 | 26 | 35 | 61 | 135 | 7 | 0 | 3 | 3 | 8 |
| 2012–13 | Boston Bruins | NHL | 46 | 7 | 20 | 27 | 75 | 22 | 7 | 12 | 19 | 14 |
| 2013–14 | Boston Bruins | NHL | 80 | 24 | 35 | 59 | 91 | 12 | 4 | 3 | 7 | 4 |
| 2014–15 | Boston Bruins | NHL | 81 | 18 | 26 | 44 | 81 | — | — | — | — | — |
| 2015–16 | Los Angeles Kings | NHL | 81 | 20 | 35 | 55 | 79 | 5 | 0 | 3 | 3 | 4 |
| 2016–17 | Edmonton Oilers | NHL | 82 | 23 | 27 | 50 | 50 | 13 | 2 | 4 | 6 | 20 |
| 2017–18 | Edmonton Oilers | NHL | 82 | 10 | 24 | 34 | 80 | — | — | — | — | — |
| 2018–19 | Edmonton Oilers | NHL | 79 | 6 | 14 | 20 | 91 | — | — | — | — | — |
| 2019–20 | Calgary Flames | NHL | 68 | 8 | 12 | 20 | 54 | 10 | 1 | 5 | 6 | 17 |
| 2020–21 | Calgary Flames | NHL | 56 | 10 | 13 | 23 | 46 | — | — | — | — | — |
| 2021–22 | Calgary Flames | NHL | 82 | 10 | 11 | 21 | 84 | 12 | 0 | 1 | 1 | 33 |
| 2022–23 | Calgary Flames | NHL | 77 | 7 | 12 | 19 | 43 | — | — | — | — | — |
| 2023–24 | Boston Bruins | NHL | 4 | 0 | 2 | 2 | 2 | — | — | — | — | — |
| 2025–26 | Springfield Thunderbirds | AHL | 5 | 0 | 1 | 1 | 4 | — | — | — | — | — |
| 2025–26 | Fife Flyers | EIHL | 26 | 5 | 7 | 12 | 18 | — | — | — | — | — |
| NHL totals | | | 1,177 | 233 | 353 | 584 | 1,301 | 136 | 29 | 48 | 77 | 229 |

=== International ===
| Year | Team | Event | Result | GP | G | A | Pts | PIM |
|---|---|---|---|---|---|---|---|---|
| 2007 | Canada | SS | 1st place, gold medalist(s) | 8 | 0 | 3 | 3 | 16 |
| 2023 | Canada | WC | 1st place, gold medalist(s) | 10 | 2 | 2 | 4 | 4 |
| Junior totals | | | | 8 | 0 | 3 | 3 | 16 |
| Senior totals | | | | 10 | 2 | 2 | 4 | 4 |

== Awards and honours ==
=== Major junior ===
| Award | Year(s) |
|---|---|
| President's Cup champion | 2006 |
| Memorial Cup champion | 2007 |
| Stafford Smythe Memorial Trophy | 2007 |
| Memorial Cup All-Star Team | 2007 |

=== NHL ===
| Award | Year(s) |
|---|---|
| NHL YoungStars Game | 2008, 2009* |
| Stanley Cup champion | 2011 |

* Did not play due to injury

=== Boston Bruins ===
| Award | Year(s) |
|---|---|
| Seventh Player Award | 2008 |
| Eddie Shore Award | 2009, 2015 |
| Bruins Three Stars Awards | 2011, 2012 |
| Named one of top 100 best Bruins players of all-time | 2024 |

=== Calgary Flames ===
| Award | Year(s) |
|---|---|
| J. R. "Bud" McCaig Award | 2019 |

== Notes ==
Awards and achievements
| Preceded by Alexander Radulov | Winner of the Stafford Smythe Memorial Trophy; 2007 | Succeeded by Dustin Tokarski |
