= Katharina Schroth =

Teacher, gymnastic coach, and rehabilitation specialist

- Born: February 22, 1894; Dresden, Germany
- Died: February 19, 1985 (aged 90)
- Known for: Schroth Method for Scoliosis

Katharina Schroth (February 22, 1894 – February 19, 1985) was a German physiotherapist known for developing the Schroth method to treat scoliosis.

Schroth was born in Dresden, Germany with scoliosis. At the age of 16, she began to use a thoracic brace, a common treatment to prevent further curvature of the spine. She was dissatisfied with the brace, as it was not fully effective and restricted movement, so she sought to find other treatment options for her condition. Through a process of self-experimentation, she developed techniques involving specific breathing methods, improving postural perception, and specific postural corrective movements. These techniques eventually became the basis for the Schroth method, which was shared among physiotherapy institutions to treat other patients. The Schroth method set a precedent for how related techniques were developed.

For this work, Schroth was awarded the Federal Cross of Merit by the Federal Republic of Germany.

== Personal life ==
=== Early life ===
Schroth was born on February 22, 1894, in Dresden, Germany. Born with moderate scoliosis, she was given a steel brace to wear indefinitely at the age of 16. Her dissatisfaction with the brace treatment led her to research an alternative. She used mirrors to assess herself and find solutions. Inspired by a balloon, she looked at the asymmetry of her torso. She tried to manipulate the differences by overcorrecting them through breathing and watching her body move in the mirror. After analyzing how her body reacted to the different breathing patterns that she tried, she began to look for ways to manipulate her body to correct her spine. She did this by developing a pulley system to manipulate her torso, while she continued to watch the effects in a mirror.

=== Early careers ===
As a teacher at a Rackow’s School of Business and Languages in Dresden, it is said that Schroth was able to correct those spinal deformities sufficiently that teachers at the school noticed, and told her that they saw a difference. She eventually left the school and began working in functional gymnastics. Here, she combined her knowledge of gymnastics with her techniques to improve her spinal deformities. She later began to lecture on this topic, preparing for her lectures by studying anatomy and having medical practitioners test her knowledge. In 1921, she opened her first therapy institute, Breathing Orthopedics.

=== Family ===
Katharina Schroth was married to Franz Schroth and had a daughter named Christa. Christa was a physiotherapist and took over her mother’s work. Later, Christa's son, Hans-Rudolf Weiss, became a physician and furthered his grandmother’s work.

== Career ==
=== The Schroth method ===
From the age of 16, Schroth continuously developed and critiqued her scoliosis correction techniques over many years, looking to improve them. She found inspiration for improvements from many different aspects of her life, from a balloon to her work as a gymnastics coach. This technique became known as the Schroth Method. It is a non-invasive technique that can both prevent scoliosis from becoming worse and correct it. The technique is individualized and unique to each person because no two cases of scoliosis are the same.

The goals of the Schroth Method are de-rotating, elongating, and stabilizing the spine. The foundations of the Schroth method look at muscular symmetry, rotational angular breathing, and awareness of posture through stretching and exercising certain muscles. Schroth's use of a mirror to see how her body was oriented led to the concept of postural awareness, which is still used in the method today. The method involves overcompensating against the body's irregularities in posture throughout the day.

Being mindful throughout the day is a central part of the Schroth method. Schroth also looked at the ideas of rotational angular breathing. This idea came from the balloon or ball analogy that allowed her to see that when parts of the spine or ribs are concave, breathing in certain ways can make them appear straight and symmetrical. This allows the body to stretch in the way that it is supposed to, and to see different muscles that are lacking in strength. The final concept involved in the Schroth method is muscular symmetry. Through exercise and stretching, a person can fix the asymmetrical aspects of their spinal curvatures by locating and strengthening certain weak areas of muscle to support the spine and fix its irregularities. This allows certain overworked muscles to relax and results in better symmetry in both muscle strength and conformity. The Schroth method was a pivotal technique in scoliosis treatment and has changed how many different therapies were developed.

=== Opening institutions ===
Once Schroth had created a process that helped reverse and halt the spinal deformities, she opened Breathing Orthopedics in 1921 in Meissen. This institute was in a small building with a garden, and different tools and structures that were used for individual and group treatments. They performed a lot of their techniques in the garden so that their skin could feel the sun’s heat and that they could get some fresh air. Her husband, Franz Schroth, helped individual patients at the institute with certain corrections and with specific strength exercises. The institute worked on specific postural correction through correctional breathing patterns and correctional postural perceptions. This method had a 3-month rehabilitation period. Their daughter, Christa Schroth, helped with the spinal corrections in the 1930s and 1940s.

In 1955, Schroth and her family moved to West Germany, where she founded her second therapy institute in Sobernheim to treat both German and international patients. Her daughter, Christa, eventually became the institute’s director and worked there until she retired in 1995. The institute helped about 150 people at a time with scoliosis or kyphosis. On average, patients are treated within a 6-week period. The institute was named the Katharina Schroth Klinik in the 1980s. The first prospective controlled trial was conducted from 1989 to 1991. This clinic now uses braces as its first treatment, but they use a derivative of Schroth’s original techniques of specific postural correction, correction of breathing patterns, and correction of postural perception for rehabilitation.

== Awards ==
Schroth was awarded the Federal Cross of Merit from the Government of the Federal Republic of Germany for her work in opening two institutions and creating an innovative process of treating people with scoliosis.

== Publications ==
- Lehnert-Schroth, Christa (2007). Three-dimensional Treatment for Scoliosis: Physiotherapeutic Method for Deformities of the Spine. Martindale Press. ISBN 978-0-914959-02-1.
