= Jo Beckwith =

American YouTuber

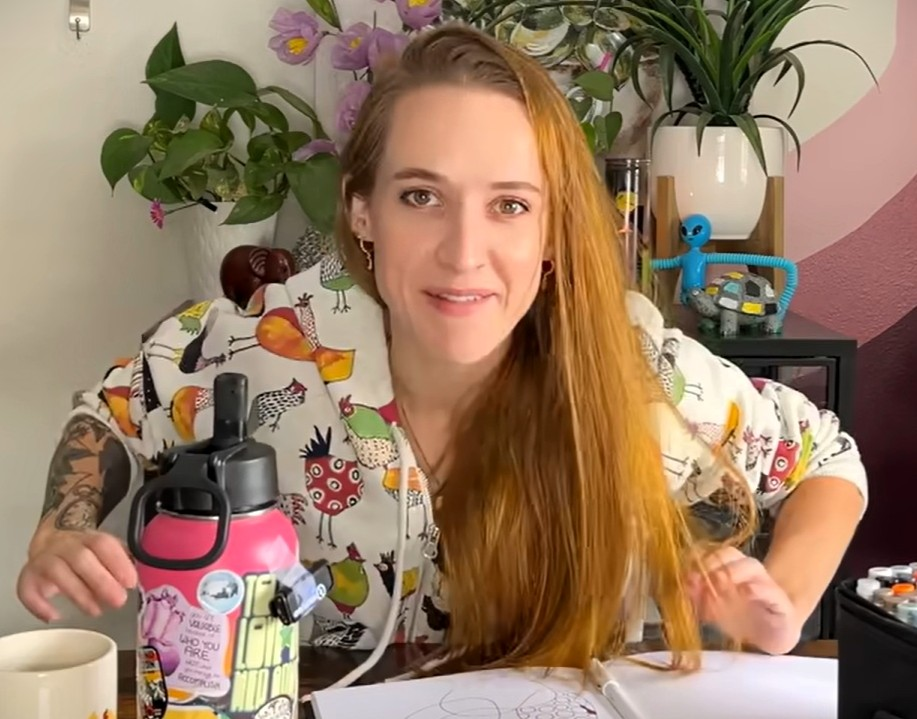
- Beckwith in 2024
- Born: Jordan Beckwith
- Occupation: YouTuber

YouTube information
- Channel: Footless Jo
- Years active: 2018–present
- Genres: Education; lifestyle; vlogging
- Subscribers: 1.05 million
- Views: 653 million
- Last updated: June 19, 2026
- Website: www.footlessjo.com

Jordan 'Jo' Beckwith is an American YouTuber and activist also known as Footless Jo. She is a below-knee amputee whose content focuses on disability and mental health awareness.

== Early life ==
When she was 13, Beckwith fell off a horse while riding in Colorado Springs, fracturing her ankle. She subsequently underwent many surgeries, but continued to experience chronic pain and limited functionality.

== Career ==
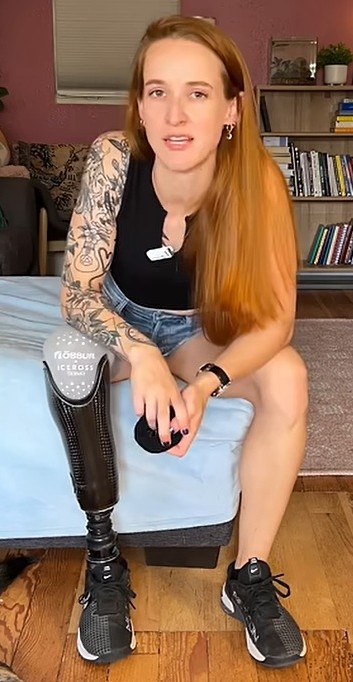
Beckwith in 2024

Beckwith began her YouTube channel, Footless Jo, during her recovery from amputation in 2018. In 2019, the channel became more prominent following a video she released titled, "How I Said Goodbye to My Ankle". That video went viral and garnered over 8 million views. Footless Jo focuses on amputation, disability, and mental health. Beckwith's second channel, Trauma Talk, which she stopped posting to in 2021, explored living in the aftermath of trauma.

In 2021, Beckwith partnered with Shades for Migraine in a media campaign to raise awareness about migraines. She has said her migraines, which began in her 20s, are more debilitating and difficult than being an amputee. Beckwith appeared in a 2024 commercial for the migraine medication Nurtec ODT, which also featured Lady Gaga.

As of May 2024, Footless Jo had 1.01 million YouTube subscribers. As of August 2021, Beckwith also had 118,000 followers on Instagram and 744,200 followers on TikTok.

== Personal life ==
Beckwith lives in Colorado. In 2018, at age 27, Beckwith began considering amputation after being told that an ankle replacement, the other treatment option, would only delay amputation for another 1.5–5 years. She underwent a below-knee amputation on October 11, 2018, at the University of Colorado Hospital in Denver.

On August 27, 2015, Beckwith married Brian Thomas. The two divorced in 2022.

Beckwith is a stroke survivor. She experienced a cerebellar occipital stroke on January 28, 2024, while practicing jiu-jitsu.

Beckwith spent several years as a follower of Charismatic Christianity and was a devout conservative Christian until early adulthood. She has since used her online platform to criticize the movement's faith-healing doctrine and no longer subscribes to this belief or belongs to a specific religious denomination.
