= Posture corrector =

Posture awareness device

A posture corrector, also known as a postural corrector, is a device that leads to awareness of the current posture. They can be in the form of braces, as well as restrictive clothing, with other types of gadgets also available on the market. Modern devices may include electronics, gyroscopes and magnets . They have been on the market for 30 years. The scientific evidence for the effectiveness of postural correctors is limited, and possibly even biased, since some postural corrector manufacturers fund the research. Some devices may cause harm to the user. And there is little evidence linking back pain to slouching or bad posture.

A posture corrector (or postural corrector) is a device intended to increase awareness of a person’s current posture. Products on the market include braces and restrictive garments, as well as electronic gadgets; some modern devices incorporate electronics (e.g., sensors) and related components.

Some sellers also explicitly describe posture correctors as a reminder/memory aid rather than a treatment: for example, houdingcorrectors.nl states in its disclaimer that its aids are not medical advice and are intended only as a reminder, not to treat or cure any condition.
