= Auctus Surgical =

American medical device company

- Company type: Private
- Industry: Medical devices
- Founded: 2017
- Founders: John Ashley; John Barrett; Murali Kadaba; Dillon Kwiat
- Headquarters: San Francisco Bay Area, California, U.S.
- Website: auctussurgical.com

Auctus Surgical is an American medical device company developing a vertebral body tethering system for the treatment of scoliosis.

== History ==
Auctus Surgical was founded in 2017 in the San Francisco Bay Area by John Ashley, John Barrett, Murali Kadaba, and Dillon Kwiat. In 2017, the company was awarded top honors at the inaugural UCSF Pediatric Device Consortium Accelerator Pitch Competition.

In August 2021, Auctus Surgical received FDA Breakthrough Device Designation and a U.S. patent for its vertebral body tethering system.

In 2025, Auctus Surgical was selected as one of the finalists in the AAOS OrthoPitch technology pitch competition.

== Technology ==
The Auctus Dynamic Tethering System uses a flexible polyethylene tether anchored to the spine with bone screws. The implanted device is adjustable using an external magnetic controller.

Techniques involving vertebral body tethering have been discussed in peer-reviewed medical literature, with one author disclosing an advisory role with Auctus Surgical.

== Regulatory milestones ==
The company received FDA Breakthrough Device Designation for its dynamic vertebral body tethering system on August 11, 2021.

== Recognition ==
- Named one of the Best New Spine Technologies for 2020 by Orthopedics This Week
- Received top honors at the 2017 UCSF Pediatric Device Accelerator Pitch Competition
- Finalist in the 2025 AAOS OrthoPitch Technology Competition
- Featured among advanced products for early onset scoliosis by The Spine Market Group
- Received third place at the 2021 UCSF-Stanford Pediatric Device Accelerator Pitch Competition
- Received top honors at the 2022 UCSF Pediatric Device Accelerator Pitch Competition
- Named Winner in the 2019 National Capital Consortium for Pediatric Device Innovation
