= Avkt =

Russian masculine given name

Avkt (Russian: Авкт) is an old and rare Russian Christian male first name. The name is derived from the Latin name Auctus, which is in turn derived from the Latin verb augeo, meaning to multiply, to increase.

The patronymics derived from "Avkt" are "А́вктович" (Avktovich; masculine) and "А́вктовна" (Avktovna; feminine).
