= Ankle replacement =

Surgical procedure

- ICD-9-CM: 81.56
- MedlinePlus: 007254

Ankle replacement, or ankle arthroplasty, is a surgical procedure to replace the damaged articular surfaces of the human ankle joint with prosthetic components. This procedure is becoming the treatment of choice for patients requiring arthroplasty, replacing the conventional use of arthrodesis, i.e. fusion of the bones. The restoration of range of motion is the key feature in favor of ankle replacement with respect to arthrodesis. However, clinical evidence of the superiority of the former has only been demonstrated for particular isolated implant designs.

== History ==
Since the early 1970s, the disadvantages of ankle arthrodesis and the excellent results attained by arthroplasty at other human joints have encouraged numerous prosthesis designs also for the ankle. In the following decade, the disappointing results of long-term follow-up clinical studies of the pioneering designs has left ankle arthrodesis as the surgical treatment of choice for these patients. More modern designs have produced better results, contributing to a renewed interest in total ankle arthroplasty over the past decade.

Nearly all designs from pioneers featured two components; these designs have been categorized as incongruent and congruent, according to the shape of the two articular surfaces. After the early unsatisfactory results of the two-component designs, most of the more recent designs feature three components, with a polyethylene meniscal bearing interposed between the two metal bone-anchored components. This meniscal bearing should allow full congruence at the articular surfaces in all joint positions in order to minimize wear and deformation of the components. Poor understanding of the functions of the structures guiding ankle motion in the natural joint (ligaments and articular surfaces), and poor restoration of these functions in the replaced joint may be responsible for the complications and revisions.

== Prosthetic design ==
The main objectives of the prosthetic design for ankle joint replacements are:

1. to replicate original joint function, by restoring an appropriate kinematics at the replaced joint;
2. to permit a good fixation of the components, which would involve an appropriate load transfer to the bone and minimum risk of loosening;
3. to guarantee longevity of the implant, which is mainly related to wear resistance;
4. to attain feasibility of implantation given the small dimensions of the joint.

As with other joint replacements, the traditional dilemma between mobility and congruency must be addressed. Unconstrained or semiconstrained designs allow the necessary mobility but require incongruent contact, thereby giving rise to large contact stresses and potentially high wear rates. Conversely, congruent designs produce large contact areas with low contact stresses but transmit undesirable constraint forces that can overload the fixation system at the bone-component interface.

== Indications ==
The indications for the operation in general are as follow:

1. patients with primary or posttraumatic osteoarthritis with relatively low functional demand;
2. patients with severe ankle rheumatoid arthritis but not severe osteoporosis of the ankle;
3. patients suitable for arthrodesis but rejecting it.

The general contraindications are:

1. varus or valgus deformity greater than 15 degrees, severe bony erosion, severe talus subluxation;
2. substantial osteoporosis or osteonecrosis particularly affecting the talus;
3. previous or current infections of the foot;
4. vascular disease or severe neurologic disorders;
5. previous arthrodesis of the ipsilateral hip or knee or severe deformities of these joints.

Other potential contraindications such as capsuloligamentous instability and hindfoot or forefoot deformities affecting correct posture, are not considered relevant if resolved before or during this surgery.

== Outcome ==
The outcome of an ankle replacement includes factors like ankle function, pain, revision and implant survival. Outcome studies on modern designs show a five-year implant survival rate between 67% and 94%. and ten-year survival rates around 75%. Mobile bearing designs have enabled implant survival rates to continue to improve, reaching as high as 95% for five years and 90% for ten years. Ankle replacements have a 30-day readmission rate of 2.2%, which is similar to that of knee replacement but lower than that of total hip replacement. 6.6% of patients undergoing primary TAR require a reoperation within 12 months of the index procedure. Early revision rates are significantly higher in low-volume centres.

Clinical ankle scores, such as the American Orthopaedic Foot and Ankle Society (AOFAS) or the Manchester Oxford Foot & Ankle Questionnaire are outcome rating system for ankle replacements. Further outcome instruments include radiographic assessment of component stability and migration, and the assessment of its functionality in daily life using gait analysis or videofluoroscopy; the latter is a tool for three-dimensional measuring of the position and orientation of implanted prosthetic components at the replaced joints.

A randomised controlled trial comparing ankle replacement with ankle fusion (the TARVA study) found that both led to similar improvements in walking, standing and quality of life. Fixed bearing (but not mobile bearing) ankle replacements outperformed ankle fusion in a separate analysis. A cost-effectiveness analysis revealed that ankle replacement may be better value for money over the course of a person's lifetime.

== See also ==
- Ankle fusion
