= Weightlifting belt =

Weight training equipment

Weightlifting belts are used during weightlifting, powerlifting, and less frequently during weight training and strength training. Additionally, they are sometimes employed by employees in industrial settings. In these work environments, the equipment is usually called a back belt or back support belt.

The purpose of a weight lifting belt is twofold: it reduces stress on the lower back muscles by allowing the lifter to safely increase intra-abdominal pressure, and it increases the lifter's proprioception which may lead to a decrease in lumbar hyperextension and other forms of spinal deformation.

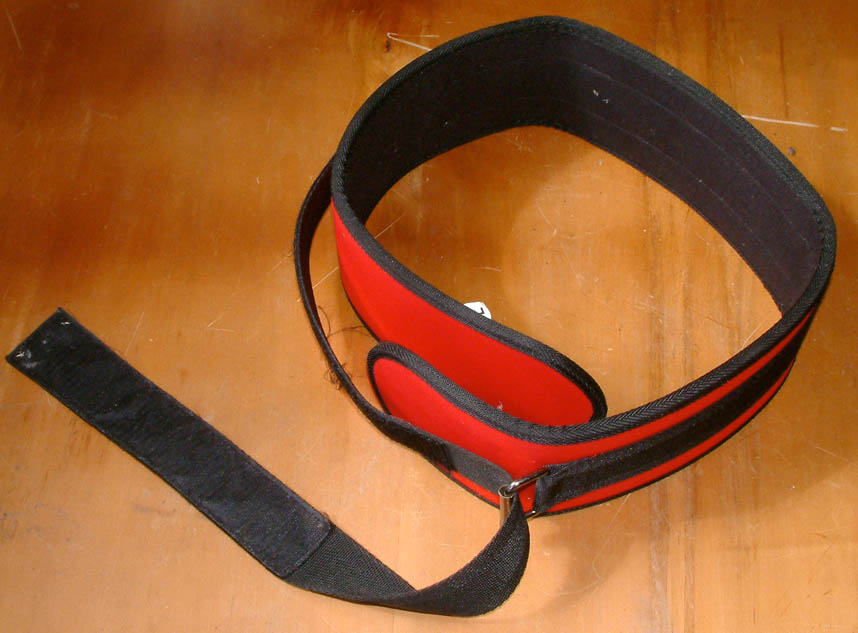
A lifting belt is sometimes worn to help support the lower back.

== Properties ==
Classical weight lifting belts are made of leather. The belt's width is variable. The narrow part is placed around the abdominal region and the wide one near the back. The belt's shape was designed so as not to hinder weightlifters during performance of the snatch and clean and jerk. Generally, the portion of the belt that crosses the small of the back is approximately fifteen cm (six inches) in width, while the portion crossing the abdomen is narrower.

Powerlifting belts are of a fixed width, and stiffer than traditional weight lifting belts, since powerlifters generally don't perform olympic style exercises such as the snatch and clean and jerk.

== Usage ==
The belt is usually used in exercises where the lower back gets a heavy load, like the squat, deadlift, or military press.

In industrial settings, back support belts have not been proven to reduce the frequency or severity of injury. Nevertheless, many companies mandate their use.

== See also ==
- Barbell
- Trap bar
- Dumbbell
- Weighted clothing
