= Scoliometer =

Medical device

A scoliometer is an instrument used to measure the distortions of the torso by a clinician to get a proper calculation/diagnosis confirmation of the condition (scoliosis).

== See also ==
- Adams Forward Bend Test
