= Adams Forward Bend Test =

Physical test to diagnose scoliosis

- Purpose: Diagnosis of scoliosis

The Adams Forward Bend Test is used in many situations to diagnose scoliosis; however, it is not a primary source for a diagnosis. This test is often used at schools and doctors' offices to check for scoliosis. The patient bends forward, as if they are diving. If the patient has scoliosis, their back often has a prominent line where the spine is, and one side is higher than the other. A patient's back is completely straight if they do not have scoliosis.

The test, named after William Adams, was described in 1865. He discovered "the nature of the rotational element of scoliosis" after performing a postmortem on surgeon and geologist Gideon Mantell, who had suffered from spinal problems for years.

== See also ==
- Scoliometer
