= Boston brace =

Back brace

The Boston brace, a type of thoraco-lumbo-sacral-orthosis (TLSO), is a back brace used primarily for the treatment of idiopathic scoliosis in children. It was developed in 1972 by M.E "Bill" Miller and John Hall at the Boston Children's Hospital in Boston, Massachusetts.

== Information ==
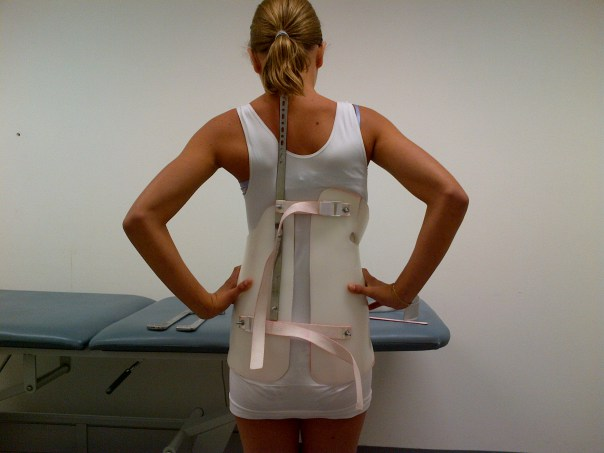
Rear view of a woman wearing a Boston brace

Since it lacks the metal superstructure of the Milwaukee brace, which was the most commonly worn brace until the development of the Boston brace, the brace is typically not noticeable under clothing. The Boston brace is prescribed for correcting curves in the lumbar or thoracolumbar part of the spine. It is designed to keep the lumbar area of the body in a flexed position by pushing the abdomen in and flattening the posterior lumbar contour. Pads are placed at the apex of the curves to provide pressure, and areas of relief from pressure are positioned opposite the curves.

The brace is normally used with growing adolescents to hold a 20° to 45° advancing curve. The brace is made of high density polypropylene lined with polyethylene foam that is customized to the individual patient, and it opens in the back via a series of Velcro straps.

Daily use of the brace ranges from 16 to 23 hours a day. The brace is intended to minimize the progression to an acceptable level, not to correct the curvature.

== History ==
M.E. "Bill" Miller patented the Boston brace in 1975.
