= Ankle fusion =

Ankle surgery

Ankle fusion, or ankle arthrodesis, is surgery of the ankle to fuse the bones to treat arthritis and for other purposes. There are different types of ankle fusion surgery. The surgery involves the use of screws, plates, medical nails, and other hardware to achieve bone union. Ankle fusion is considered to be the gold standard for treatment of end-stage ankle arthritis. It trades joint mobility for relief from pain. Ankle fusion has also been used to resolve foot drop in certain circumstances. Complications of ankle fusion may include infection, non-union, and, rarely, amputation.

== Outcomes ==
A randomised controlled trial comparing ankle replacement with ankle fusion found that both led to similar improvements in walking, standing and quality of life. Fixed bearing (but not mobile bearing) ankle replacements outperformed ankle fusion in a separate analysis. A cost-effectiveness analysis revealed that ankle replacement may be better value for money over the course of a person's lifetime.

== Tibiotalocalcaneal arthrodesis ==
Tibiotalocalcaneal (TTC) arthrodesis is a special type of ankle fusion. It is used in select situations, for instance as a salvage therapy in severe complicated cases of ankle deformity or in other situations. One major approach to TTC arthrodesis uses an intramedullary (IM) medical nail. A 2011 systematic review reported the rate of bone union to be 87%, with a range of 74 to 93% in different studies. The average time to union was 4.5 months. Only 26% of cases of non-union required revision fusion, with the remaining cases being asymptomatic or not being severe enough to require revision. It was concluded that the nail can oftentimes provide structural support and relief from pain even without union. The complication rate was 56%, with hardware-related problems comprising a majority of complications. The rate of reoperation was 22%, with screw removal done in 11.4%, nail removal done in 4.2%, revision fusion done in 3.4%, and amputation in 1.5%. The review concluded that there is a good fusion rate with TTC arthrodesis using an IM nail but that the surgery has a high rate of complications. On the other hand, a 2016 review concluded that there was a low rate of complications.

== Bilateral ankle fusion ==
Ankle fusion is usually done only unilaterally, but more rarely, bilateral ankle fusions have been performed.

== See also ==
- Ankle replacement
