= Neuromechanics of idiopathic scoliosis =

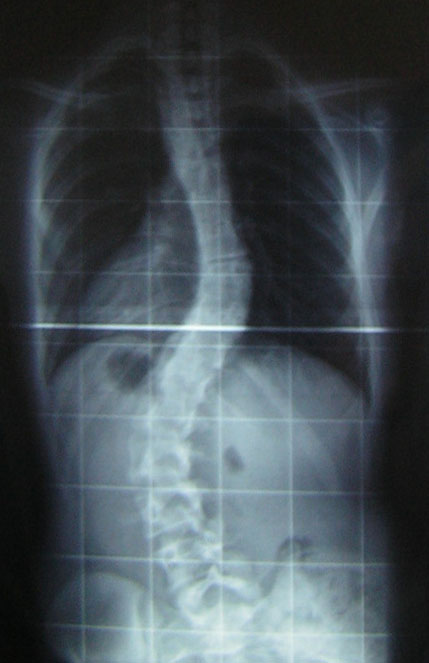
X-ray image of an Idiopathic scoliosis

The neuromechanics of idiopathic scoliosis is about the changes in the bones, muscles and joints in cases of spinal deformity consisting of a lateral curvature scoliosis and a rotation of the vertebrae within the curve, that is not explained by either congenital vertebral abnormalities, or neuromuscular disorders such as muscular dystrophy. The idiopathic scoliosis accounts for 80–90% of scoliosis cases. Its pathogenesis is unknown. However, changes in the vestibular system, a lateral shift of the hand representation and abnormal variability of erector spinae motor map location in the motor cortex may be involved in this disease. A short spinal cord and associated nerve tensions has been proposed as a cause and model for idiopathic scoliosis. Besides idiopathic scoliosis being more frequent in certain families, it is suspected to be transmitted via autosomal dominant inheritance. Estrogens could also play a crucial part in the progression of idiopathic scoliosis through their roles in bone formation, growth, maturation and turnover. Finally, collagen, intervertebral disc and muscle abnormalities have been suggested as the cause in idiopathic scoliosis, although these are perhaps results rather than causes.

== Demographic data ==
The patient's age at presentation of scoliosis, the remaining growth, the menarche status and the magnitude of the curve are used to foresee the idiopathic scoliosis curve progression. However, the relative importance of each factor and how they may interact is not clearly defined. The earlier the scoliosis appears, the more likely it will progress. Though it is recommended that idiopathic scoliotic people should practice a sport for aerobic exercise and development of a positive body image, practice of a sport at a competitive level is to be avoided.

=== Age ===
Idiopathic scoliosis can appear at different ages. Infantile idiopathic scoliosis that appear from the birth to 3 years old, account for 0.5% of idiopathic scoliosis. Juvenile idiopathic scoliosis that appear from the 4 to 10 years old, account for 10.5% of idiopathic scoliosis. Adolescent idiopathic scoliosis that appear after the age of 10 years, account for 89% of idiopathic scoliosis. From these statistics, it seems that individuals are at highest risk of developing idiopathic scoliosis during adolescence.

=== Physical activity level ===
Because scoliotic people have higher joint laxity compared to non-scoliotic people, they are drawn toward gymnastics but the practice of gymnastics for less than 20 hours training per week does not cause scoliosis. Based on populations that had more than 20 hours training per week, idiopathic scoliosis has been observed among 10% of tennis players, 16% of young swimmers and 24% in professional ballet companies. The exposure of the body to high repetitive mechanical constraints may influence the occurrence of idiopathic scoliosis.

== Physiology ==
Cobb angle measurement of a scoliosis; concave side on the left; convex side on the right

Vertebra and curves of the vertebral column

Cobb angle is a common measure to classify scoliosis. The greater the angle, the more serious is the disease but the smaller is the number of patients. One to three out of every hundred people have idiopathic scoliosis curves greater than 10° with an equal proportion of boys and girls. One to three out of every thousand people have idiopathic scoliosis curves greater than 30° with a ratio of eight girls for every one boy.

Scoliosis is also classified according to the region(s) they affect. The vertebral column can be deformed at the thoracic level, at the lumbar level or at both. In the lumbar region, scoliosis induces perturbations to standing balance. The thoracic region is the location that most impacts movement strategies. Scoliosis impedes on the movement of the ribs, places the respiratory muscles at a mechanical disadvantage and displaces the various organs of the thoracic cavity.

=== Skeleton ===
In a scoliotic patient, the vertebral column experiences extension forces on the convex side and compression forces on the concave side. At the apical vertebra, average bone density for the concave cortical bone is higher than for the convex cortical bone, and cancellous bone density is higher for the concave side than for the convex side. The concave side of a vertebra is less porous and has a thicker cortical bone than the convex side, which is consistent with Wolff's law about bone remodeling.

=== Muscle ===
Scoliotic adolescents, at the apex vertebra, have a higher muscle activity (as measured by surface electromyography) on the convex side than on the concave side in sitting or standing conditions. Because in scoliotic people wearing a brace, the muscle activity of the erector spinae muscles decreased on the convex side when walking with the brace and because after spinal arthrodesis surgery, idiopathic scoliotic people showed a significant decrease in paravertebral muscle activity on the convex side but not on the concave side, the muscular asymmetry in idiopathic scoliosis is thought to be a biomechanical consequence of the scoliotic curvature rather than its cause.

== Effects on movement ==
Planes
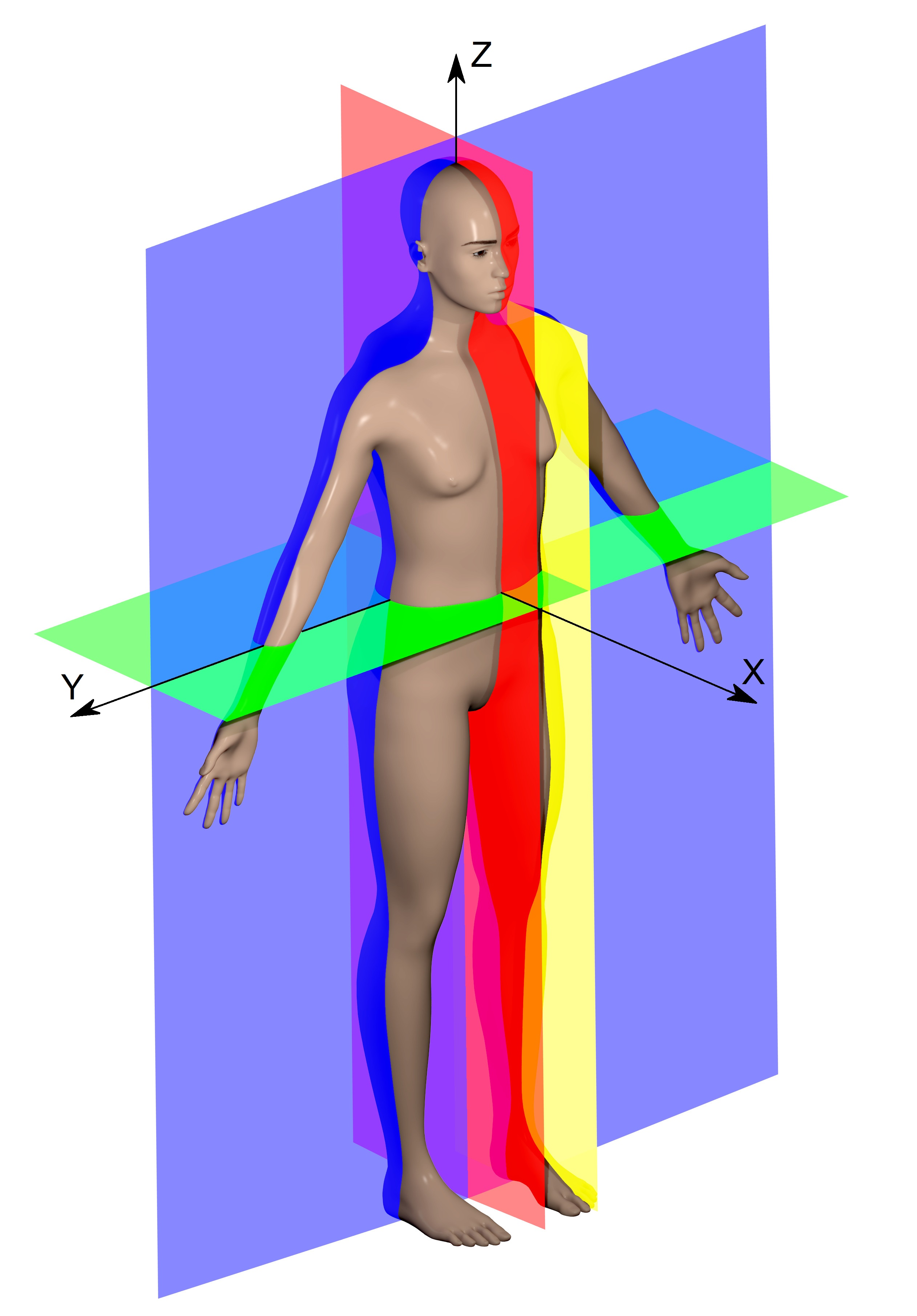
- The main anatomical planes of the human body, including median (red), parasagittal (yellow), frontal or coronal plane (blue) and transverse or axial plane (green).

Since idiopathic scoliosis and its surgery affect the vertebrae and the joints along the spine, the range of motion is expected to be different between patients and non-scoliotic people. There is a hypothesis that states that the vertebral column behaves like a torsional spring: while walking, the angular momentum of the shoulders compensates the angular momentum of the pelvis (i.e. when the shoulders rotate clockwise, the pelvis rotates counterclockwise; when the pelvis rotates clockwise, the shoulders rotate counterclockwise). As scoliosis perturbs the architecture of the shoulders, spine and pelvis, gait also differs between patients and non-scoliotic people.

=== Range of motion ===
Independently of the Cobb angle, the affected vertebra and the age, idiopathic scoliotic people have a larger rachis flexion range of motion and a narrower hips extension range of motion than non-scoliotic people. The range of motion for rachis extension, hips flexion, left and right lateral flexions are similar to non-scoliotic people.

After arthrodesis, all rachis ranges of motion decrease because of surgery but hips extension range of motion is comparable to the one of non-operated scoliotic people.

=== Gait ===
In terms of gait, while walking at a constant speed of 4 km/h for a few minutes until a steady state is reached, relative to non-scoliotic people, idiopathic scoliotic people have a frontal (i.e. coronal) pelvis, hip, and shoulder, transversal hip and sagittal knee motion restriction. The step length is reduced and the stance phase duration is also reduced.

Surgical treatment of thoracolumbar/lumbar adolescent idiopathic scoliosis, whether performed with anterior spinal fusion or posterior spinal fusion arthrodesis, results in overall positive changes that lead to partial normalization of some gait parameters. After surgery, a slight reduction of trunk rotation, a decrease in shoulder rotation, an increase in frontal motion of pelvic and hips (pelvic tilt and hip abduction) are observed and no changes occurred in lower extremities during gait (knee and ankle).
