= Lumbar =

Abdominal segment of the torso

In tetrapod anatomy, lumbar is an adjective that means of or pertaining to the abdominal segment of the torso, between the diaphragm and the sacrum.

== Naming and location ==
The lumbar region is sometimes referred to as the lower spine, or as an area of the back in its proximity.

In human anatomy the five lumbar vertebrae (vertebrae in the lumbar region of the back) are the largest and strongest in the movable part of the spinal column, and can be distinguished by the absence of a foramen in the transverse process, and by the absence of facets on the sides of the body. In most mammals, the lumbar region of the spine curves outward.

== Description ==
The actual spinal cord terminates between vertebrae one and two of this series, called L1 and L2. The nervous tissue that extends below this point are individual strands that collectively form the cauda equina. In between each lumbar vertebra a nerve root exits, and these nerve roots come together again to form the largest single nerve in the human body, the sciatic nerve. The sciatic nerve runs through the back of each leg and into the feet. This is why a disorder of the low back that affects a nerve root, such as a spinal disc herniation, can cause pain that radiates along the sciatic nerve (sciatica) down into the foot.

== Muscles ==
There are several muscles in the low back that assist with rotation, flexibility and strength. These muscles are susceptible to injury, especially while lifting heavy objects, or lifting while twisting. A low back muscle strain can be extremely painful but will usually heal within a few days or weeks.

== Body weight burden ==
The lumbar portion of the spine bears the most body weight and also provides the most flexibility, a combination that makes it susceptible to injury and wear and tear over time. This is why low back pain is so prevalent.

== See also ==
- Back belts
- Lumbar hyperlordosis
- Lumbar puncture
- Lumbar vertebrae
- Loin (also called lumbus)
- Lumbago
- Waist
