= Milwaukee brace =

Back brace

The Milwaukee brace, also known as a cervico-thoraco-lumbo-sacral orthosis or CTLSO, is a back brace most often used in the treatment of spinal curvatures (such as scoliosis or kyphosis) in children but also, more rarely, in adults to prevent collapse of the spine and associated pain and deformity. It is a full-torso brace that extends from the pelvis to the base of the skull.

Milwaukee braces are often custom-made over a mold of the patient's torso, but in some cases, it can be made from prefabricated parts. Three bars—two posterior and one anterior—are attached to a pelvic girdle made of leather or plastic, as well as a neck ring. The ring has an anterior throat mold and two posterior occipital pads, which fit behind the patient's head. Lateral pads are strapped to the bars; adjustment of these straps holds the spine in alignment.

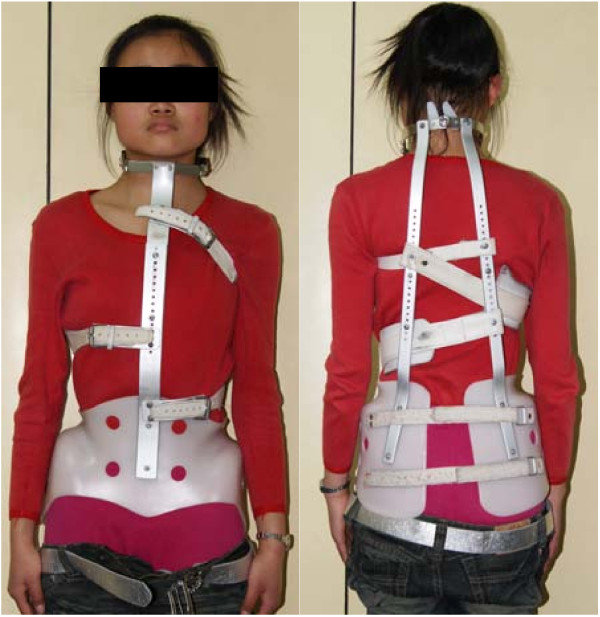
Female adolescent (14 years old) patient wearing a Milwaukee brace - with neck ring and mandible pad showing.

This brace is normally used with growing adolescents to hold a 25° to 40° advancing curve, although it has also been used successfully in adults to prevent further collapse or deformity of the spine. The brace is intended to minimize the progression of deformity to an acceptable level, not to completely correct the curvature. If, despite the brace, curve progression beyond 40-50 degrees is evident, surgery may be required.

The Milwaukee brace is often prescribed to be worn 23 hours a day until the patient reaches skeletal maturity and growth ceases. Adults with a collapsing and/or developing spinal deformity are advised to wear the brace for a minimum of 20 hours per day.

A related brace is the Boston brace (underarm brace, also known as a thoraco-lumbo-sacral orthosis, or TLSO), which is more commonly used for scoliosis. That brace does not have a neck ring and is more easily concealed under clothing, thus more acceptable to patients. However, it is not suitable for high thoracic or cervical spinal curvatures.

== History of Milwaukee Brace ==
Walter Blount first developed the brace in 1940s to assist polio patients during their post-operative care after undergoing posterior spinal fusions. Blount began using this brace for adolescent idiopathic scoliosis patients and published their results of their finding in 1956. As casting was the mainstay treatment for non-operative adolescent idiopathic scoliosis, the Milwaukee brace became a popular and widely used brace, especially as it was easily removable and Blount promoted the brace based on his experiences.
