= American Orthopaedic Foot and Ankle Society =

Orthopaedic Medical Society

- Abbreviation: AOFAS
- Formation: 1969
- Founder: Founders: Nathaniel Gould; Nicholas Giannestras; Melvin Jahss; Robert Joplin; Hampar Kelikian; Paul Lapidus; Joseph Milgram
- Founded at: Chicago, Illinois
- Type: Health organization
- Headquarters: Schaumburg, Illinois
- Fields: Orthopaedics
- Members: 2,600 (2026)
- President: Scott J. Ellis, MD
- Website: www.aofas.org
- Formerly called: American Orthopaedic Foot Society (1969–83)

The American Orthopaedic Foot and Ankle Society (AOFAS) is a professional medical society based in Schaumburg, Illinois. It was founded in 1969 and currently has a membership of around 2,600 foot and ankle orthopaedic surgeons. The society provides education, research, grants, and other services to the general public and orthopaedic doctors, allied health practitioners, and researchers specializing in orthopaedic foot and ankle medicine and surgery. The organization also operates its own peer-reviewed journal, Foot & Ankle International.

== History ==
=== Early history ===
The AOFAS was founded in 1969 as the American Orthopaedic Foot Society (AOFS) with around 150 members. Its founding members included doctors Nathaniel Gould, Robert Joplin, Nicholas Giannestras, Melvin Jahss, Hampar Kelikian, Paul Lapidus, and Joseph Milgram. Several of its founding members served as early presidents of the organization including Robert Joplin (1969–70), Nicholas Giannestras (1970–71), Nathaniel Gould (1971–72), and Melvin Jahss (1973–74). New presidents are elected by members of the society at an annual meeting each year. The society held its first scientific meeting in San Francisco in 1971. In 1973, president Robert Samilson helped make the AOFS the first affiliate of the American Academy of Orthopaedic Surgeons (AAOS).

Throughout its first decade, the society provided research grants, advised shoe manufacturers, analyzed and disseminated research, and provided education and resources to orthopaedic surgeons and the general public. In 1981, Melvin Jahss helped establish and became the first editor of the society's official peer-reviewed journal, Foot & Ankle, which would eventually be renamed Foot & Ankle International. In 1983, the members of the AOFS voted unanimously to change the name of the organization to the "American Orthopaedic Foot and Ankle Society". In the mid-1980s, the AAOS dissolved the affiliation agreements with the AOFAS and other organizations allowing them to congregate independently. This occurred under AOFAS president, John Gould (the son of founder, Nathaniel Gould).

=== 1990 to present ===
In the 1990s, the society researched and disseminated the results of several studies about footwear and its effects on feet and ankles. In particular, the studies often identified issues with women's footwear and, specifically, high heels. In a 1992 partnership with the National Shoe Retailers Association (NSRA), the AOFAS started a public awareness campaign with a pamphlet titled "10 Points of Proper Shoe Fit". In 1994, the AOFAS held a news conference to call on shoe manufacturers to create "women's shoes that do not deform the foot". Under president G. James Sammarco, in 1996, the society instituted a voluntary "seal of approval" program that allowed shoe manufacturers to send in their models to be inspected for comfort and design quality by AOFAS physicians and researchers. The organization also maintained offices in Seattle at that time.

In 2001, AOFAS president Pierce Scranton established the Orthopaedic Foot and Ankle Outreach and Education Fund (OEF), a 501(c)(3) organization that provides education and medical services to under-served communities throughout the world. In 2005, the organization established the website FootCareMD.com to provide education and resources to the general public. By 2010, the organization's headquarters were located in Rosemont, Illinois. In 2011, Judith Baumhauer became the organization's first female president. In 2014, OEF changed its name to the Orthopaedic Foot & Ankle Foundation.

In July 2017, the AOFAS established a consumer awareness campaign called "Look for the 'O'", which urged individuals to seek the care of orthopaedic surgeons when experiencing foot or ankle pain.

== Membership ==
The AOFAS is composed of around 2,600 foot and ankle orthopaedic surgeons. Each member is a medical doctor specializing in the diagnosis and treatment of numerous foot and ankle injuries, diseases, and other ailments. The training required includes four years of medical school and five years of medical residency followed by a one- or two-year fellowship with a specialty focus in foot and ankle care.
