= Back belt =

Lightweight belt worn around the lower back to provide lumbar support

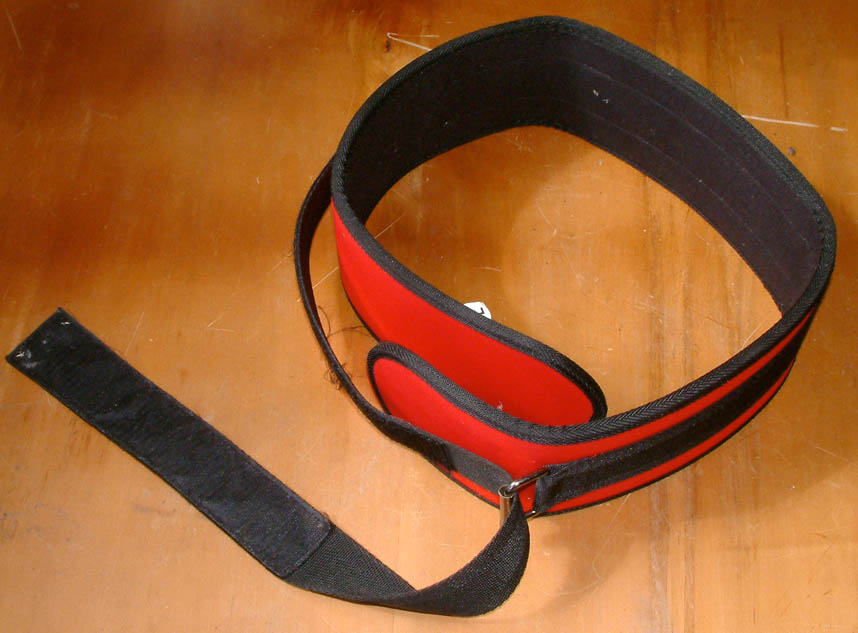
Lifting belt worn tight around the lower back

Back belts, also known as lumbar support belts or lifting belts, are wearable devices designed to support the lower back during physical activities such as lifting, bending, or prolonged standing. These belts are used in industrial settings, athletic training, and clinical rehabilitation. While widely adopted, their effectiveness in preventing back injuries remains debated. Regulatory bodies like NIOSH and OSHA emphasize comprehensive ergonomic strategies over the use of belts as a standalone preventive measure.

Overview

Back belts are primarily intended to reduce lower back strain by increasing intra-abdominal pressure and restricting spinal movement. They are frequently used by warehouse workers, construction personnel, healthcare workers, and athletes.

Types of Back Belts

Industrial Back Belts: Elastic or rigid belts worn to support lifting tasks.

Medical Braces: Prescribed to restrict movement during recovery from spinal injury.

Weightlifting Belts: Thick belts used to stabilize the core and improve lifting posture.

Theoretical Mechanisms

Back belts may:

Increase intra-abdominal pressure (IAP), reducing spinal load.

Provide proprioceptive feedback to promote safer movement.

Limit range of motion to prevent hyper flexion or twisting.

Ergonomics and Safety

Research by NIOSH suggests that back belts are not a substitute for proper ergonomics and training. Workers may overestimate the protection they offer, leading to greater risk. Emphasis is placed on hazard assessment, mechanical aids, and posture training.

Scientific Evidence

Wassell et al. (2000) found no injury rate reduction in a study of over 13,000 employees using belts.

Chen et al. (2006) observed lower muscle activity in erector spinae with a newly designed belt, though hand force remained unchanged.

Nimbarte et al. (2005) noted altered inter-joint coordination, with increased reliance on hip and knee flexion during lifting.

Regulatory Standards

OSHA and ISO 11228-1 favor workplace design and training over wearable supports. Back belts are not classified as personal protective equipment (PPE) for healthy workers.

Athletic Use

Weightlifting belts have been shown to improve performance and reduce spinal stress when lifting heavy loads. They are recommended for experienced athletes during maximal lifts and not for general exercise use.

Emerging Technologies

Modern smart belts with sensors offer real-time feedback on posture and muscle engagement. These innovations may enhance the utility of traditional back belts by promoting safer techniques.

== See also ==
- Back brace – Corrective medical device worn around a patient's back
- Passive exoskeleton – Unpowered exoskeleton
