= Anterior vertebral body tethering =

Scoliosis treatment

Anterior vertebral body tethering (AVBT) is a relatively new surgery for the treatment of scoliosis in pediatric patients. Left untreated, severe scoliosis can worsen and eventually affect a person's lungs and heart.

== History ==
In the 1950s and 1960s, doctors began experimenting with a technique called spinal fusion to straighten the spine and prevent long-term health consequences of curvatures. Fusion surgery in children employs pedicle screws and metal rods to correct the curve. Improvements to fusion techniques have been made over the years, and it remains the standard of care today. However, fusion has drawbacks, and pioneers in the field of pediatric orthopedics and neurosurgery have introduced AVBT as a minimally invasive alternative.

== New developments ==
The US Food and Drug Administration (FDA) approved the compassionate use of AVBT in August 2019 for a small population of patients. VBT uses a strong, flexible tether that is attached to screws embedded in the spine. It is important to have the surgery while the child or teen is still growing because the tether is meant to gradually change the severity of the curve as growth occurs. In addition to realigning the spine, the main benefit of VBT is that flexibility is maintained. The word "anterior" is connected with this technique because it can be done through the front or side of the chest wall (rather than the back) via a number of small incisions that typically heal quickly with proper post-surgical care. The ideal candidate has a severe curve that cannot be corrected with bracing and a Sanders Score (which measures skeletal maturity) of 3-4.

== Procedure and healing process ==
This procedure is considered an in-patient surgery under general anesthesia with hospital stays that typically last several days. AVBT may not be covered by health care insurance; nevertheless several state-of-the-art US health systems (Cincinnati Children's Hospital, Mayo Clinic, Shriners Hospitals for Children, Texas Children's Hospital and University of Missouri Health Care) offer it as an alternative to fusion for a small number of patients through the FDA's humanitarian device exemption (HDE) pathway. Most patients are eventually able to return to sports and other physical activities that require spinal flexibility. The complication profile differs from spinal fusion surgery given the nature of the procedure. Tether breakage is the most common complication, occurring in anywhere from 35–66% procedures with a median follow up time at breakage of 38 months. Reoperation rates hover around 12–22% and are a result of overcorrection or under-correction of curve, adding-on, or tether replacement.
