= Arthrodesis =

Surgical immobilization of a diseased joint

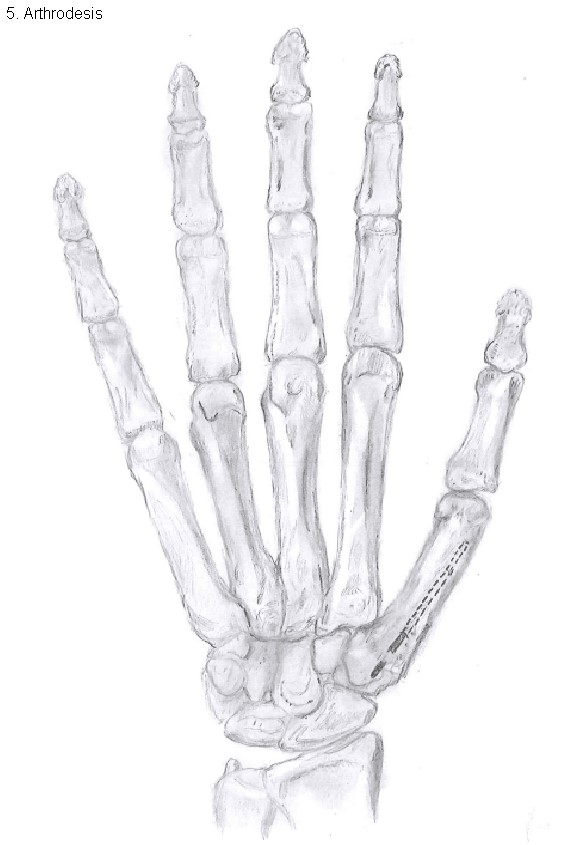
- Arthrodesis of the thumb
- Other names: Artificial ankylosis, syndesis
- ICD-9-CM: 81.0-81.3
- MeSH: D001174

Arthrodesis, also known as joint fusion, is the artificial induction of joint ossification between two bones by surgery. This is done to relieve intractable pain in a joint which cannot be managed by pain medication, splints, or other normally indicated treatments. The typical causes of such pain are fractures which disrupt the joint, severe sprains, and arthritis. It is most commonly performed on joints in the spine, hand, ankle, and foot. Historically, knee and hip arthrodeses were also performed as pain-relieving procedures, but, with the great successes achieved in hip and knee arthroplasty, arthrodesis of these large joints has fallen out of favour as a primary procedure and now is only used as a last resort in some failed arthroplasties.

== Method ==
Arthrodesis can be done in several ways:

- A bone graft can be created between the two bones using a bone from elsewhere in the person's body (autograft) or using donor bone (allograft) from a bone bank.
  - Bone autograft is generally preferred by surgeons because, as well as eliminating the risks associated with allografts, bone autograft contains native bone-forming cells (osteoblasts), so the graft itself forms new bone (osteoinductive), as well as acting as a matrix or scaffold to new bone growing from the bones being bridged (osteoconductive). The main drawback of bone autograft is the limited supply available for harvest.
  - Bone allograft has the advantage of being available in far larger quantities than autograft; however, during the treatment process the bone goes through following harvest, which usually involves deep-freezing and may also involve demineralization, irradiation and freeze-drying, kills living bone or bone marrow cells. This significantly reduces the immunogenicity (risk of graft rejection) such that no antirejection drugs are needed, and combined with appropriate donor screening practices, these processing and preservation practices can significantly reduce the risk of disease transmission. In spite of all of this processing, cancellous allograft bone retains its osteoconductive properties. Furthermore, certain processing practices have been shown to also retain the acid-stable osteoinductive proteins in cortical bone grafts, so that many bone allografts can be considered both osteoconductive and osteoinductive.
- A variety of synthetic bone substitutes are commercially available. These are usually hydroxyapatite- or tricalcium phosphate-based granules formed into a coralline or trabecular structure to mimic the structure of cancellous bone. They act solely as an osteoconductive matrix. Some manufacturers have recently begun supplying these products with soluble bone-forming factors such as bone morphogenetic protein to attempt to create a synthetic product with osteoinductive properties.
- Titanium alloy implants (plates and screws) can be attached to the two bones to hold them together in a position which favors bone growth.
- A combination of the above methods is also commonly employed to facilitate bony fusion.

At the completion of surgery and healing, which takes place over a period of several weeks to over a year, the two adjoining bones are fused and no motion takes place between them. This can have the effect of strengthening the bones, as in anterior cervical fusion.

== Horses ==
Arthrodesis is used in horses as a salvage procedure to treat severe breakdown injuries, such as failure of the suspensory apparatus, subluxation, fracture, or collateral ligament rupture. It is also performed in horses with osteoarthritis, primarily of the distal hock joints, to fuse these low-motion joints so they no longer produce pain for the animal.

== See also ==
- Ankle fusion
- Neuromechanics of idiopathic scoliosis
