= Back brace =

Corrective medical device worn around a patient's back

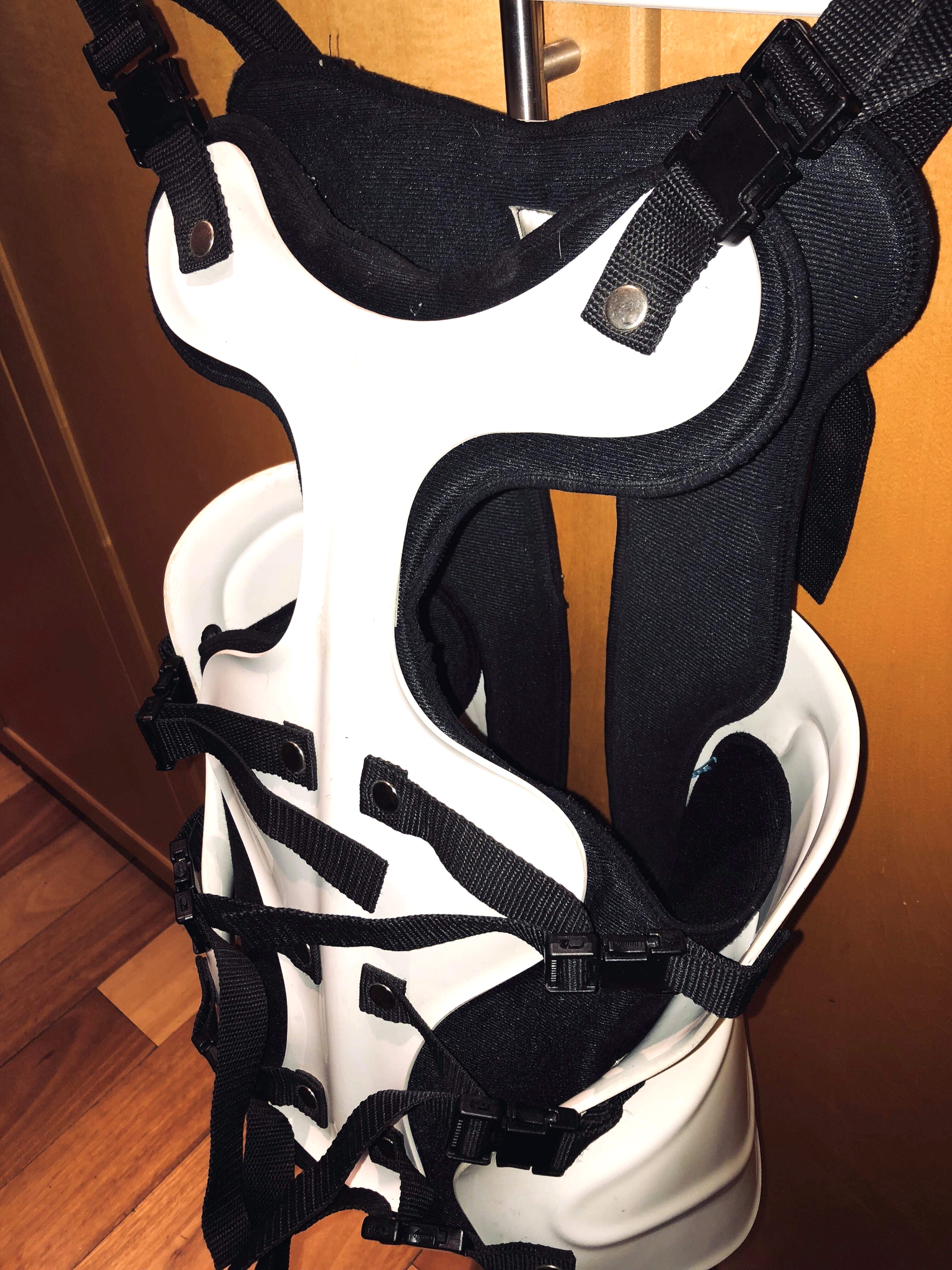
Front view of a pre-moulded plastic back brace with nylon torso and shoulder straps made for a female (pre-)adolescent patient

A back brace is a device designed to limit the motion of the spine in cases of bone fracture or in post-operative spinal fusion, as well as a preventative measure against some progressive conditions or to correct a patient's posture.

Common back braces include:

- Rigid (hard) braces : These braces are form-fitting plastic molds (historically leather) and rigid (typically metal) supports that significantly restrict motion by between 50 and 65% while rotation is limited by up to 70%.
- Soft braces : Elastic braces that limit the forward motion of the spine and assist in setting spinal fusions or supporting the spine during occasions of stress (for example, employment requiring the lifting of heavy loads)
- Semi rigid braces : Semi-rigid braces combine elements of flexible and rigid braces within one overall design. This is done by adding rigid supports or additional stiff padding and straps to the body of a flexible brace. Sometimes these added rigid supports are removable, allowing the patient to customize the level of stability to their unique needs.

== Bracing for scoliosis ==
Back braces are prescribed to treat adolescent idiopathic scoliosis, as they may stop the progression of spinal curvature in a growing child. As of 2016, the Scientific Society on Scoliosis Orthopaedic and Rehabilitation Treatment (SOSORT) recommends bracing "is important, but does not have to be applied to all patients with this specific need" for idiopathic scoliosis during growth. Multiple studies have provided strong evidence of bracing as an effective conservative treatment for children and adolescents and may also help decrease the amount of curvature in the spine; with results lasting several decades following the end of treatment and brace weaning. A variety of brace styles are available; the Boston brace is the most commonly used brace for adolescent idiopathic scoliosis (AIS). In-brace correction has been found to be directly related with treatment success, suggesting in-brace correction should be maximized; thus individualized custom braces which maximize in-brace correction show better results. Other designs include the Milwaukee brace, the Charleston bending brace, the Peak Scoliosis Bracing System, and the SpineCor (a soft brace) in the United States, Canada, and Europe. In Europe, however, the SPoRT and Cheneau and Crass Cheneau braces are also used. There has been considerable research and information published in reputable journals on back braces for scoliosis. Issues like patient compliance with treatment, the psycho-social impact of brace use, and exercise with bracing have been looked at. Quality of Life research has been attempted but is difficult due to a current lack of instruments. Bracing is the primary treatment for AIS in curves that are considered to be moderate in their severity and are likely due to progress (determined by curve pattern or type and the patient's structural maturity).

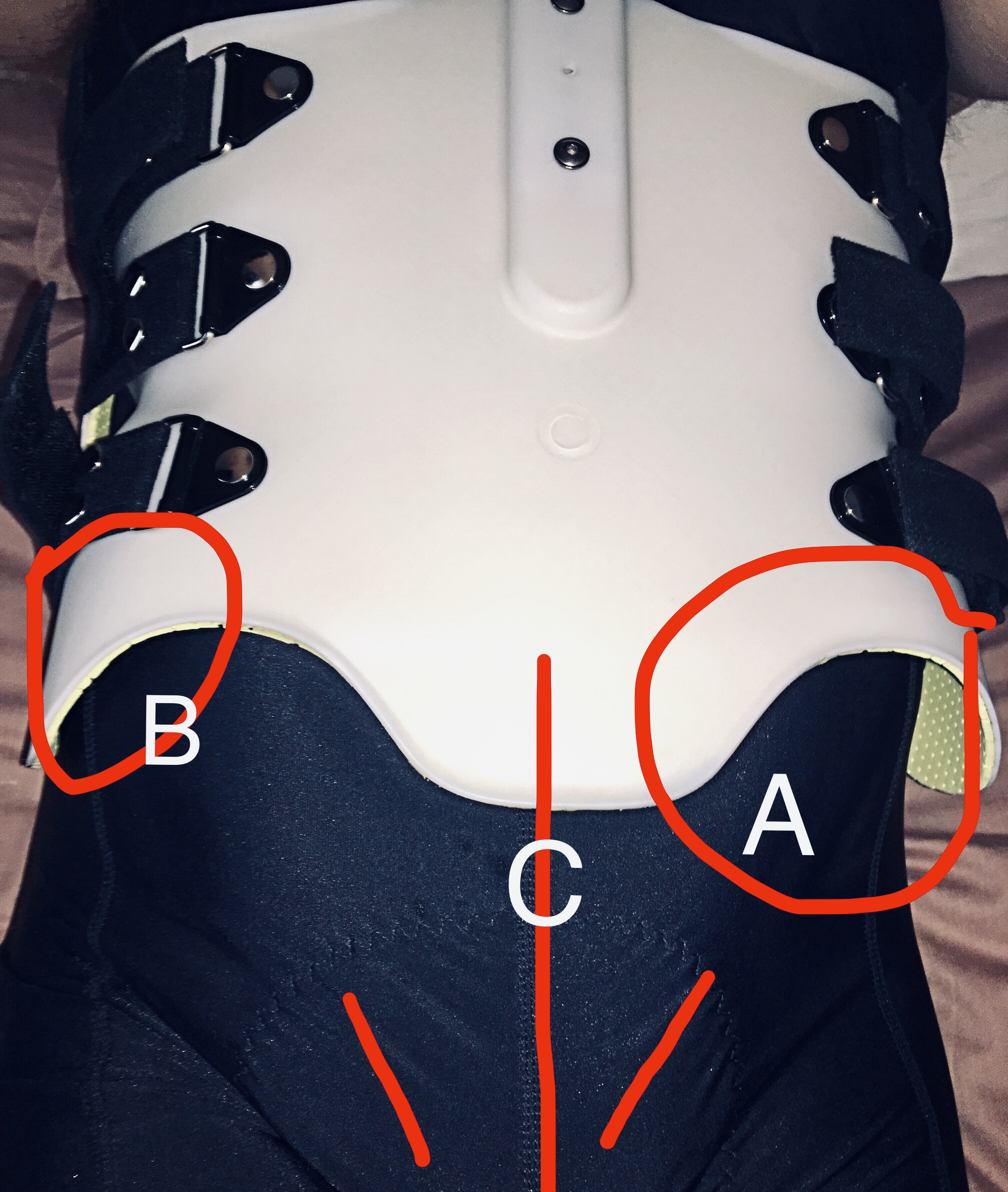
Full rigid TLSO back brace – fitted to female adolescent patient showing issues with the patient fitting around hips and pelvic areas

=== Boston brace ===
A Boston brace is a form of thoracolumbosacral orthosis (TLSO). It is the most commonly used brace in the United States. It is a symmetrical brace. It corrects curvature by pushing with small pads placed against the ribs, which are also used for rotational correction (here it tends to be slightly less successful, however). These pads are usually placed in the back corners of the brace so that the body is thrust forward against the brace's front, which acts to hold the body upright. The brace opens to the back, and usually runs from just above a chair's seat (when a person is seated) to around shoulder-blade height. Because of this, it is not particularly useful in correcting very high curves. It also does not correct hip misalignment, as it uses the hips as a base point. This brace is typically worn 20–23 hours a day.

=== Charleston bending brace ===
This brace was designed with the idea that compliance would increase if the brace were worn only at night. The brace is asymmetrical and fights against the body's curve by over-correcting. It grips the hips much like the Boston brace, and rises to approximately the same height, but pushes the patient's body to the side. It is used in single, thoracolumbar curves in patients 12–14 years of age (before structural maturity) who have flexible curves in the range of 25–35 Cobb degrees.

=== Chêneau-Gensingen Brace (CGB) ===
This brace is designed for use with the Schroth physical therapy method. It utilizes large, sweeping pads to push the body against its curve and into blown out spaces. The Schroth theory holds that the deformity can be corrected through retraining muscles and nerves to learn what a straight spine feels like, and breathing deeply into areas crushed by the curvature to help gain flexibility and to expand. The brace helps patients to keep doing their exercises throughout the day. This brace is asymmetrical, and is used for patients of all degrees of severity and maturity. It is often worn 20–23 hours a day. The brace principally contracts to allow for lateral and longitudinal rotation and movement.

=== Flexpine brace ===
Flexpine brace is a hybrid type of brace for use by non-surgical scoliosis patients. It is of 0.04 inches thickness and uses foldable urethane and plastic as its frame so that the wearer can still move their body. It is a customized product made of 3D printing material. It has an elastic band to push the curved part of the spine. This is so patients can bend their spine easier. Patients can do spine realigning exercise while wearing Flexpine brace, so they can reduce their overall treatment time by exercising and conveying the brace treatment simultaneously.

=== Milwaukee brace ===
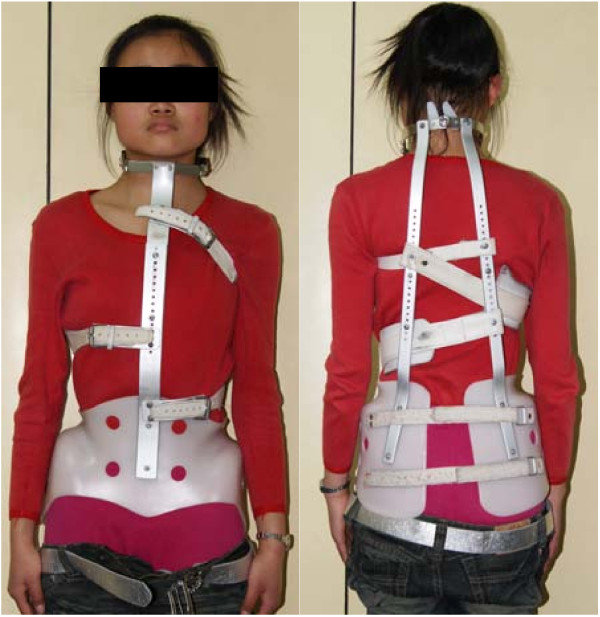
Female adolescent (14 years old) patient wearing a Milwaukee brace, with neck ring and mandible pad showing

The Milwaukee brace was a very common brace towards the earlier part of the twentieth century in the United States. It is a largely symmetrical brace. The brace is made with a harness-like hip area and metal strips rising to the chin, where a collar (neck ring) is held in place. Between the hips and chin, there are corrective thrusts given with large pads.

There is little rotational correction. Today this brace is generally used for very high thoracic curves that are severe and out of range of the Boston. This brace is typically worn 20–23 hours a day.

=== Silicon Valley Brace ===
This brace is similar to that of the Rigo-Cheneau or other Cheneau type braces in that it incorporates an individualized correction designed based on the individual's scoliosis curve pattern as determined by x-ray or MRI imaging. The brace is designed in three dimensions utilizing CAD software similar to other modern braces and is manufactured out of thermoplastic allowing for further modifications based on the individual's growth over time. Based on current scientific literature, this asymmetric brace type is designed to both prevent progression as well as reduce the curve as in-brace correction correlates to treatment outcome. This brace type is typically worn upwards of 18+ hours a day in conjunction with other conservative treatment options including physiotherapy scoliosis-specific exercises such as Schroth.

=== SpineCor brace ===
The brace has a pelvic unit from which strong elastic bands wrap around the body, pulling against curves, rotations, and imbalances. It is most successful when the patient has relatively small and simple curvatures, is structurally young, and compliant—it is usually worn 20 hours a day. The patient is not to have it off for more than two hours at a time. While it is expected that patients can participate in activities as strenuous as competitive gymnastics while in brace, it also pulls down against shoulder misalignments which compress the spine. SpineCor is marketed as a more comfortable, less restricted scoliosis brace option for adults. This brace was invented in Montréal, and is used across the country as well as being widely used in other countries.

=== Sport brace ===
SPoRT stands for "Symmetric, Patient-oriented, Rigid, Three-Dimensional active," which it intends to be. The brace is symmetrical, built with a plastic frame reinforced with aluminum rods. The brace corrects hip misalignments through padding. Large, sweeping, thick pads push the spine to a corrected position. To prevent overcorrection, however, the brace also has "stop" pads holding the spine from moving too far in the other direction. The brace runs from just above the chair to T3 in many instances—it is successful at correcting high thoracic curves. In front, it goes around the patient's breast and up, even to pushing against the collar bone. Though it sounds restricting, it has been tested for comfort while participating in athletics. The theory holds that the support that the brace gives will help the patient's body learn to work as though it had no curve muscularly. Then the muscles would be able to support the spine, preventing further collapse. This brace is used for all curve patterns and types, even ones considered past brace treatment by other schools. The brace is typically worn 22 hours a day, and often coupled with a physical therapy program.

== Bracing for other purposes ==
=== Thoracolumbosacral orthosis ===
A thoracolumbosacral orthosis (TLSO), is a two-piece plastic brace supporting the spine from the thoracic vertebrae of the chest, to the base of the spine at the sacrum.

The rigid lumbar or TLSO (Thoraco – Lumbo – Sacral – Orthosis) is used, when regardless of surgical correction, or in some cases in place of surgical correction, spinal stability has not been fully achieved. In some cases of spinal fractures these can be managed without surgery using such a TLSO brace but this is only in the case where the type of fracture has its own inherent stability. The brace provides additional immobilization, which should safely allow condition or fracture to heal with a minimal risk of further injury. Under these circumstances, this brace must be worn for approximately several months whenever the patient is out of bed. In other cases the doctor or orthotist may prescribe such a brace to deal post-surgery immobilization, or for the longer-term treatment of conditions of a more progressive nature, such as correction of scoliosis in the growing adolescent. These are described briefly below:

After having undergoing complex spinal surgeries, this is especially the fusion procedures, a brace will probably be necessary. There are a number of factors determining the need for brace wear include: – the severity of any instability, the lack of good bone quality, the location of the surgery, or the nature of the deformity. In these situations, a rigid brace may be needed.

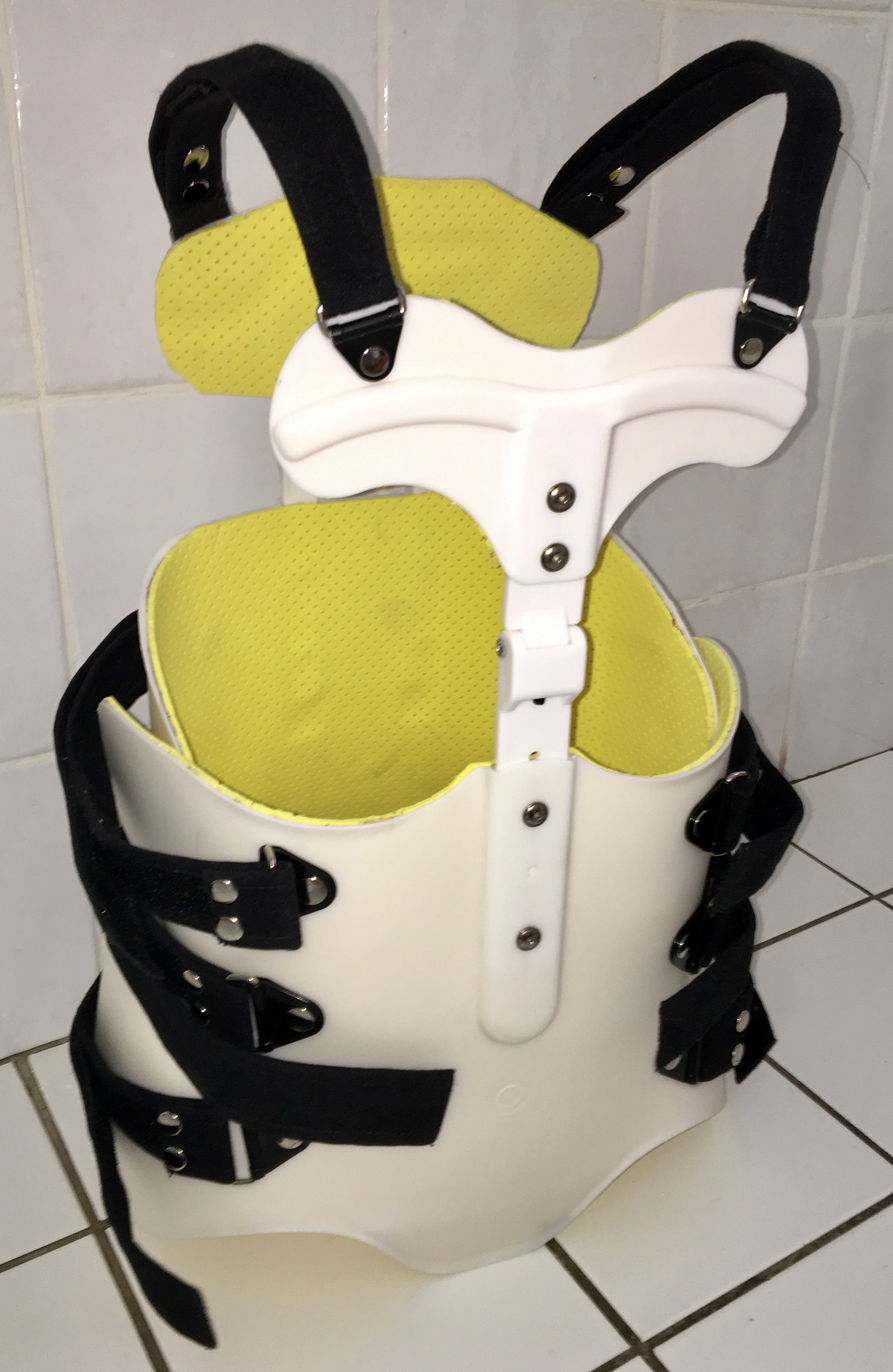
TLSO back brace – thoracolumbosacral orthosis, a brace for the mid to lower spine

Once again, the brace is specifically for immobilization and support. It should be worn whenever the patient is out of bed for more than 10 minutes. This brace will be worn for approximately several months after surgery but your doctor or surgeon will let the patient know if such a brace is necessary.

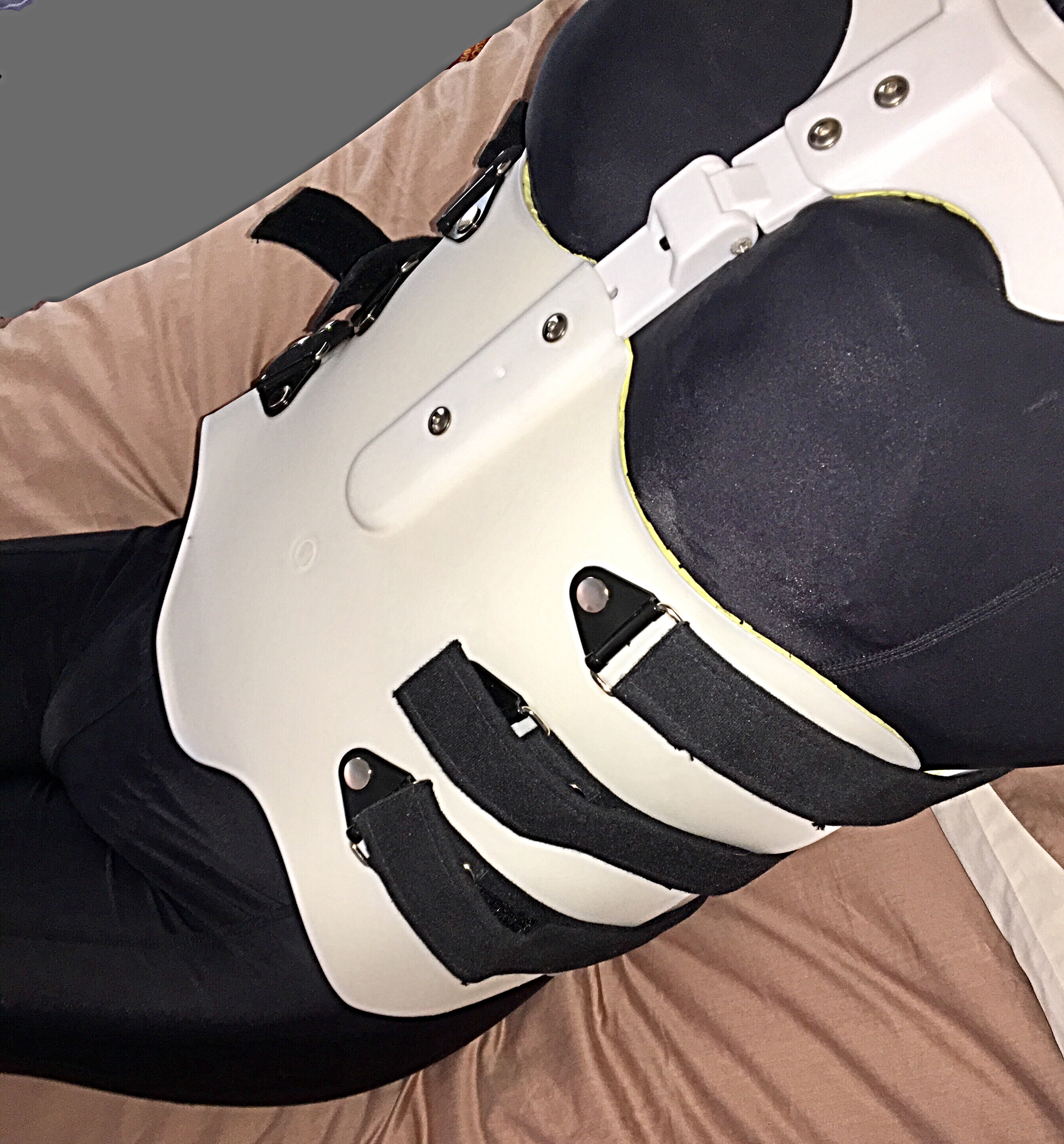
Adolescent female patient shown in a rigid plastic moulded TLSO orthopedic brace

Rigid braces are also used for the correction of scoliosis in the growing children and adolescents. These braces are very specific in nature and are used until the adolescent has finished growing (usually to about 16 years of age). Use of a brace does not always control the scoliosis curvature. Indeed, the curvature in very aggressive scoliosis can continue to progress despite bracing. Typically in such circumstances, surgery to correct the scoliosis could eventually be necessary despite many years of bracing. However, the brace may replace the need for surgery and this is always preferred if possible.

The brace for scoliosis is a rigid plastic brace and must be worn a minimum of 18 out of 24 hours per day. Ongoing brace adjustments will needed and are necessary to maximize the scoliosis correction. If you are required to wear a brace to treat ongoing adolescent scoliosis, it will be necessary to visit the clinic or doctor or orthotist every few months. In a few circumstances, very restrictive braces that utilize thigh cuff extensions to control the pelvis are sometimes needed and this type of brace is worn to treat a very specific situation, such as a patient who has undergone pelvic fusion where the bone quality is at risk or questionable.

The brace comes in a variety of forms and can be used for treating severe or unstable compression fractures as well as other injuries and conditions.

=== Jewett brace ===
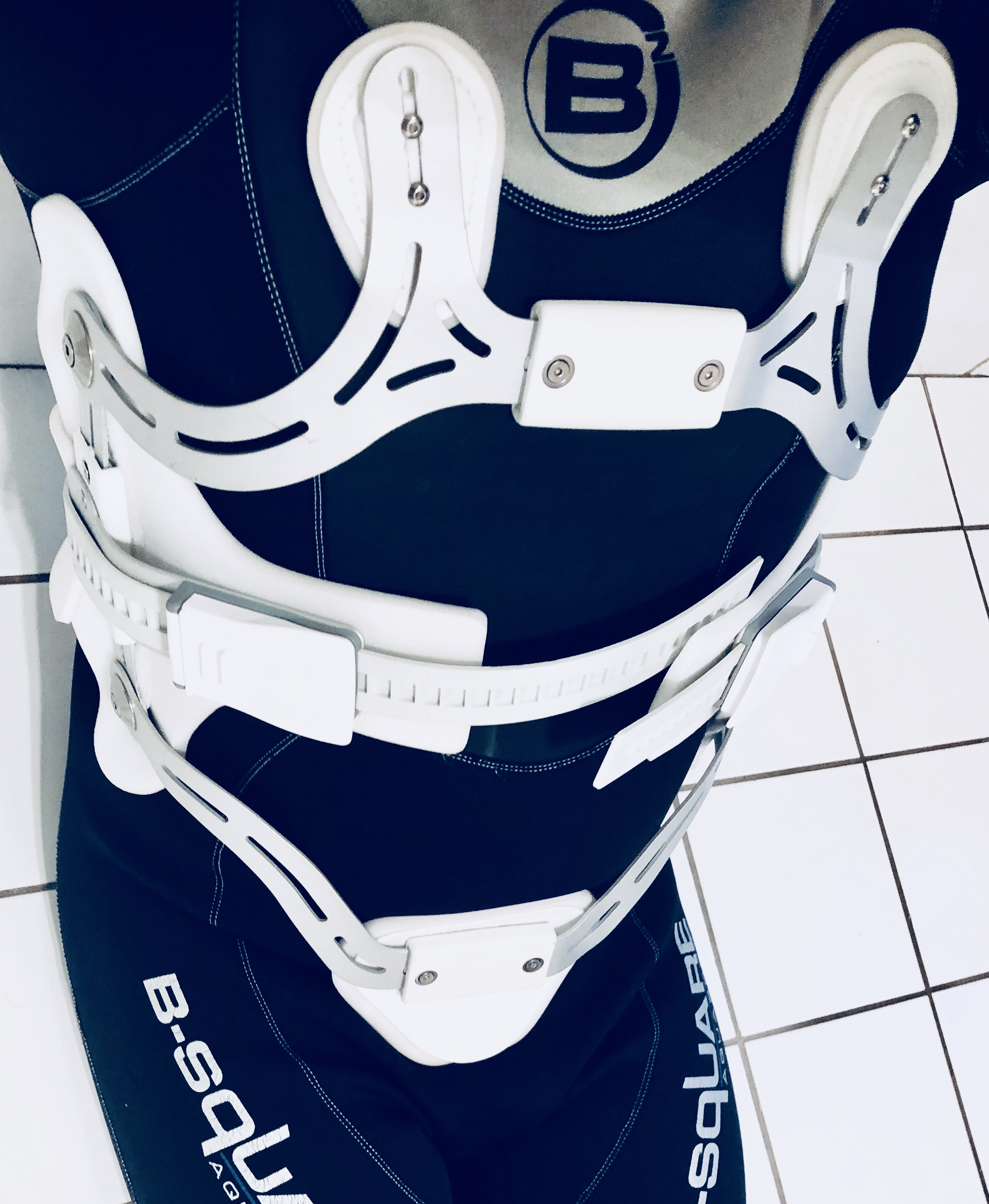
TLSO Jewett hyperextension body brace fitted to adolescent female patient in full support body suit

A Jewett (hypertension) brace is a hyperextension brace that prevents the patient from bending forward too much. This brace designed to give support to the patient's thoracic and lumbar spine by preventing twisting and flexion (bending forward).

=== Corset brace ===
A corset brace is similar to a traditional corset. It typically has metal or plastic stays to limit forward movement. It puts pressure over the belly to take pressure off the spine and promote healing.

=== Posture brace / posture corrector ===
A posture brace or a posture corrector is to help a person improve their posture and maintain their body in a straight and upright position.

Posture correctors realign the body to its original position by straightening from ankle to knee, pelvis, and shoulders to ear.

== See also ==
- Back belt
- Orthotics
- Cervical collar
- Vertebrae
- Dental braces
- Orthopedic cast
- Kendrick extrication device
- Long spine board
- Halo (medicine)
